= U.S. Route 43 =

Highway in the United States

U.S. Route 43
- US 43 highlighted in red

Route information
- Length: 410 mi (660 km)
- Existed: 1934–present

Major junctions
- South end: US 90 in Prichard, AL
- I-65 in Satsuma, AL; US 84 in Grove Hill, AL; US 80 in Demopolis, AL; US 11 from Eutaw to Tuscaloosa, AL; I-20 / I-59 south of Knoxville, AL; I-22 / US 78 in Hamilton, AL; US 72 from Muscle Shoals to near Killen, AL; US 64 in Lawrenceburg, TN
- North end: US 31 / US 412 in Columbia, TN

Location
- Country: United States
- States: Alabama, Tennessee
- Counties: AL: Mobile, Washington, Clarke, Marengo, Greene, Tuscaloosa, Fayette, Marion, Franklin, Colbert, Lauderdale; TN: Lawrence, Maury

Highway system
- United States Numbered Highway System; List; Special; Divided
- Alabama State Highway System; Interstate; US; State
- Tennessee State Routes; Interstate; US; State
← US 42	US	→ US 44
← SR 42	AL	→ SR 44
← SR 41	TN	→ SR 43

U.S. Route 43 (US 43) is a 410-mile-long (660 km) north–south United States Highway in the Southern states of Alabama and Tennessee. It travels from Prichard, Alabama, to Columbia, Tennessee. The highway's southern terminus is in Prichard, at an intersection with US 90, and its northern terminus is in Columbia at an intersection with US 31/US 412/US 412 Bus.

In Alabama and Tennessee, all of the U.S. Highways in each state have one or more unsigned state highways designated along its length. US 43 travels concurrently with Alabama State Route 13 (SR 13) from its southern terminus to an intersection in southeastern Fayette County. For the rest of its length in the state, US 43 is concurrent with signed state highways. In Tennessee, US 43 travels concurrently with Tennessee State Route 6 (SR 6) along its entire length in the state. It also has an unsigned concurrency with SR 227 between Saint Joseph and Loretto.

== Route description ==
=== Alabama ===
US 43 begins along Telegraph Road in Prichard, Alabama, at the point where US 90 crosses over Telegraph Road; a short connector road joins the two highways nearby. It travels northward toward Chickasaw on a three-lane road that features one lane in each direction and a center turning lane. Upon intersecting the Craft Highway in Chickasaw, the roadway adds another lane in each direction. As it enters Saraland, the highway meets State Route 158 (SR 158), which connects to Interstate 65 (I-65) to the west. Farther north in the town, it meets SR 213. It continues north and then crosses I-65 on the northern edge of Satsuma. US 43 continues north on a four-lane divided highway that runs roughly parallel to the meandering Mobile River. A trumpet interchange near Calvert provides access to a steel mill between the highway and the river. In McIntosh, the highway passes Andrews Chapel, a historic log church. North of McIntosh, the highway runs through forest land; clearings dot the roadside occasionally. At Wagarville, the highway intersects SR 56, which travels west toward Chatom. Near Jackson, the road crosses the Tombigbee River just before an intersection with SR 177. SR 177 serves as a business route for US 43 as it passes through downtown Jackson. A connector road on either side of US 43 links the highway to SR 69, which passes over the four-lane road. SR 177 intersects US 43 again as it leaves Jackson. US 43 curves to the northeast as it heads toward Grove Hill. There, SR 295 splits off to the east and passes through the town. Shortly thereafter, the highway meets US 84 at a diamond interchange. SR 295 rejoins US 43 on the northern end of Grove Hill. Roughly halfway between Grove Hill and Thomasville, SR 178 connects Fulton to the highway system. Near the center of Thomasville, the road meets SR 154, which heads southwest toward Coffeeville. In northern Thomasville, US 43 splits away from the roadway, which continues as SR 5. Instead, US 43 heads northwesterly until it intersects SR 10 at Dixons Mills.

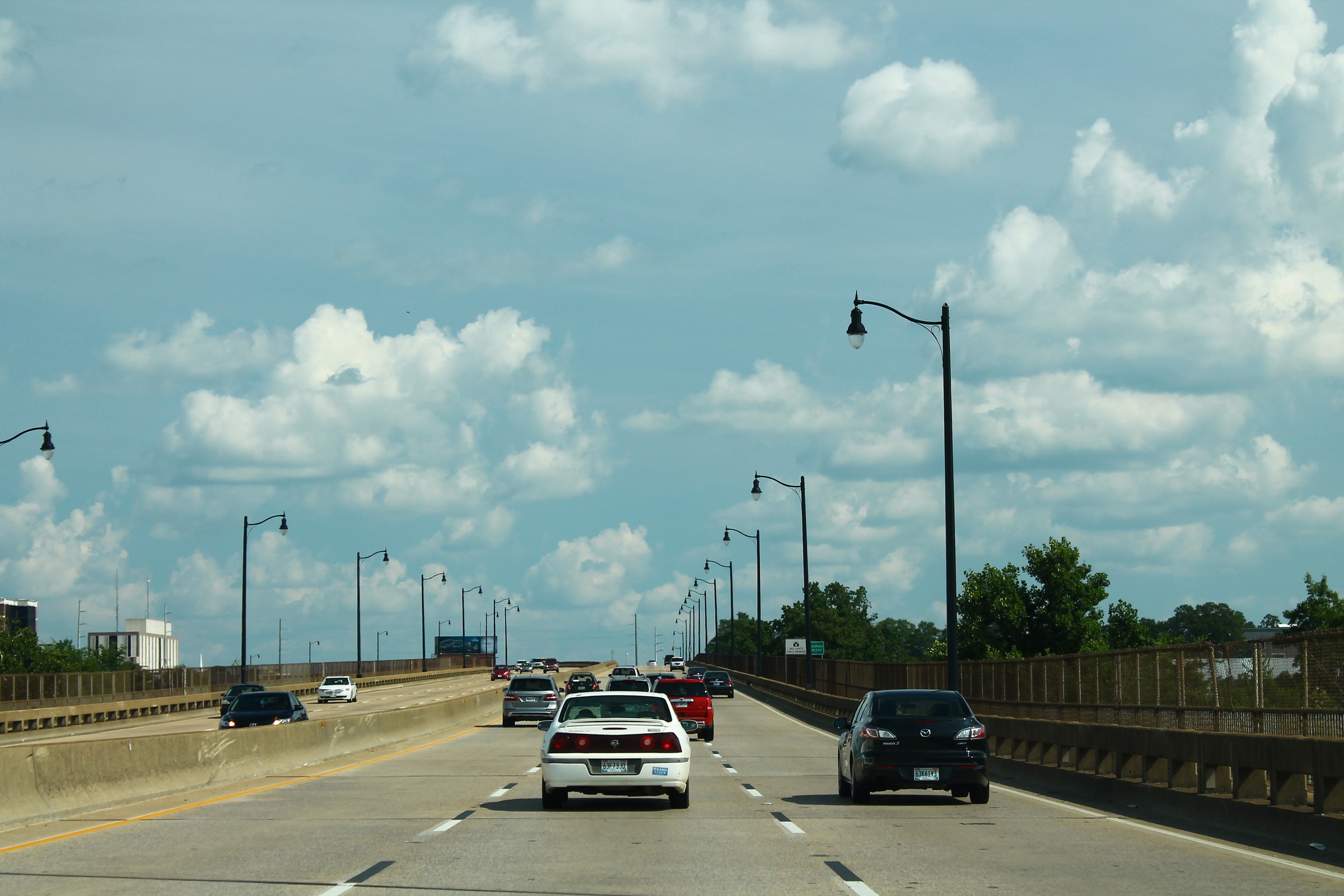
US 43 in Tuscaloosa

US 43 continues northward from Dixons Mills along a winding road that leads to Linden. There, it meets SR 69, which came from the southwest. The two highways travel together through Linden, where they are overlapped briefly by SR 28. When the highways reach Providence, the two roads fork and US 43 takes the western leg; SR 69 heads north toward Greensboro. It then curves slightly to the northwest and meets US 80 in southeastern Demopolis. The two routes head west together for about one mile (1.6 km) before US 43 turns back to the north. The highway passes by the town square and in between the Tombigbee and Black Warrior Rivers before crossing the latter. North of Demopolis, it follows a two-lane road that passes through wooded farmland that clears as the road goes north. When the highway reaches Eutaw, it joins up with SR 14, which comes from Greensboro to the southeast. In the middle of town, the two routes meet northbound U.S. Route 11 in Alabama at the Greene County Courthouse Square District; southbound US 11 goes around the other side of the block, effectively making the courthouse square its median. The three routes only share one block before SR 14 departs to the west and the other two routes head in the opposite direction. Outside of Eutaw, the roadway curves around to the north and it runs a parallel course to I-20/I-59, though a few miles offset. At Knoxville, the two U.S. Highways cross over the two Interstate Highways, after which, US 43 and US 11 travel on the north side of the interstates until reaching Tuscaloosa. In southwestern Tuscaloosa, the two highways cross the Joe Mallisham Parkway, which serves as a western bypass of Tuscaloosa and Northport. Just south of downtown Tuscaloosa, US 43 and US 11 diverge at an interchange with SR 69, which also happens to be the northern end of I-359. SR 69 descends from the elevated highway and joins US 43 on Lurleen B. Wallace Parkway through the downtown area and past the historic Bama Theatre. The northbound and southbound lanes are separated by a block until they join to cross the Black Warrior River on the Hugh R. Thomas Bridge just above the Oliver Dam and then enter Northport. Shortly after crossing the river is an interchange with 5th Street. The highways ease to the north and continue until reaching US 82. There, SR 69 continues to the north while US 43 turns west onto US 82. These two highways head west for a short distance before US 43 turns away to the northwest. The highway curves back around to head northeast as it intersects SR 171. Farther north in Northport, US 43 meets the end of the Tuscaloosa–Northport western bypass.

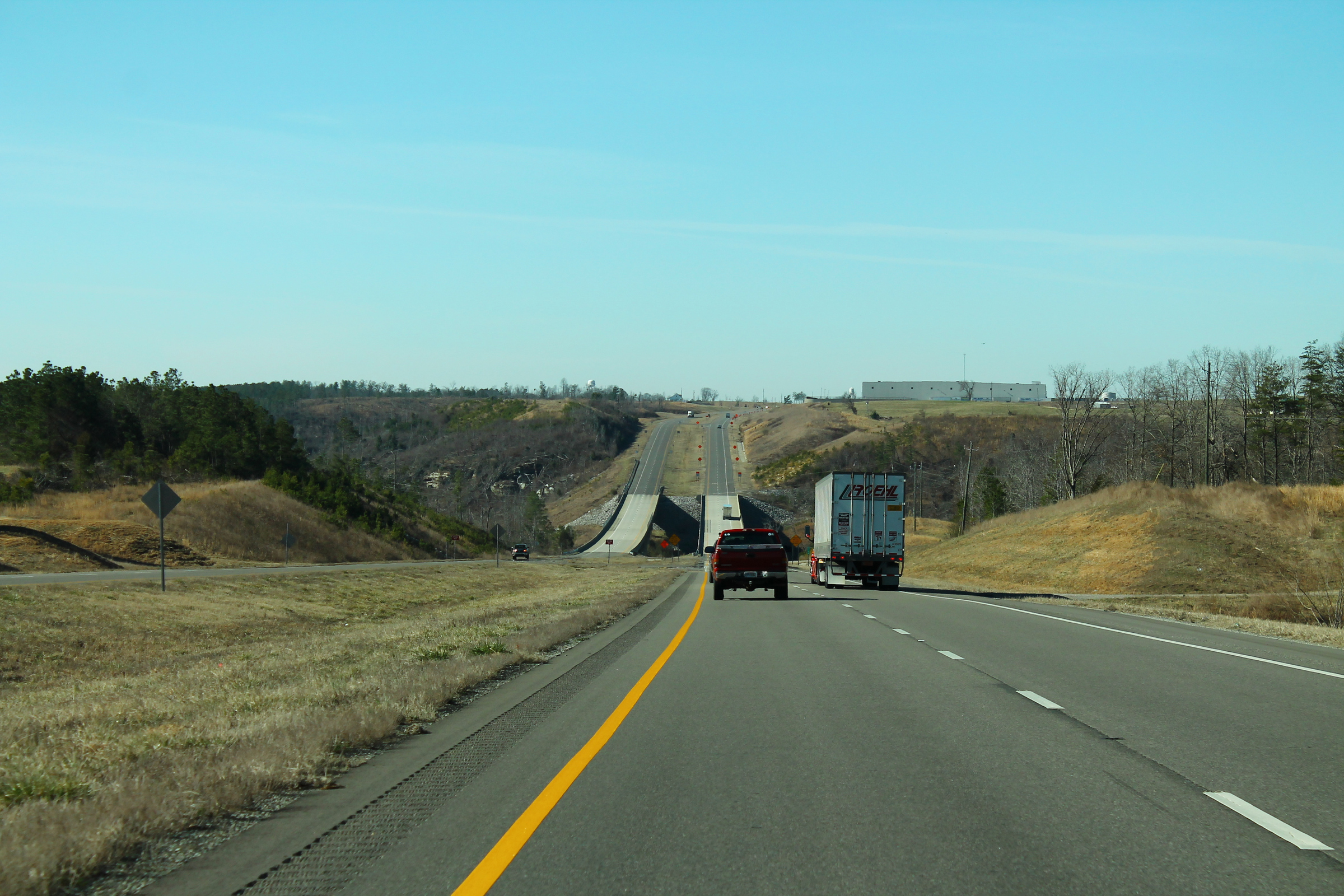
US 43 near Hackleburg

It crosses over an arm of Lake Tuscaloosa and travels along the western edge of Binion Creek Landing Park. It winds to the north-northwest and intersects SR 18. At this intersection, US 43 ends its southern concurrency with SR 13 and begins a concurrency with SR 18. Also, SR 13 becomes a signed highway at this intersection. US 43 and SR 18 wind to the north-northeast and enter Bankston and later pass through Stough. Approximately 2,000 feet (610 m) after crossing the Sipsey River the highways enter Fayette where they intersect SR 171 (2nd Avenue Southeast) in the downtown area. At this intersection, SR 18 continues to the west-northwest on Columbus Street West and US 43 and SR 171 travel to the north-northeast on 2nd Avenue Northeast. North of Fayette, the two highways intersect the southern terminus of SR 129 and the western terminus of SR 102 shortly thereafter. They curve to the north-northwest and then briefly travel through the Fayette State Experiment Forest. The highways curve to the north-northeast and enter Winfield. They cross over some railroad tracks of BNSF Railway before intersecting SR 118 (Bankhead Highway) and the southern terminus of SR 253. US 43, SR 118, and SR 171 travel concurrently to the northwest toward Gu-Win and Guin. They pass a 3M plant before they intersect the western terminus of SR 44 (7th Street) in Guin. The highways intersect US 278 (unsigned SR 74) and the eastern terminus of SR 142 (11th Avenue West) in downtown Guin. At this intersection, SR 118 turns south onto US 278 west, and US 43 and SR 171 turn north onto US 278 east; the three highways travel to the north-northwest. Between Guin and Hamilton, they have an interchange with I-22/US 78. They cross over the Buttahatchee River as they enter Hamilton. They intersect SR 17 south of the downtown area. At this intersection, SR 171 ends and SR 17 joins the US 43/US 278 concurrency. At Bexar Avenue West, US 278 turns east, while US 43 and SR 17 continue to the north. The highways curve back to the northeast and intersect the southern terminus of SR 187. They enter Hackleburg and in the main part of town is an intersection with SR 172 and the southern terminus of SR 253 (Clay Street). They then continue to the north and intersect SR 13 for a second time northwest of Phil Campbell. They enter Russellville and have an interchange with SR 24.

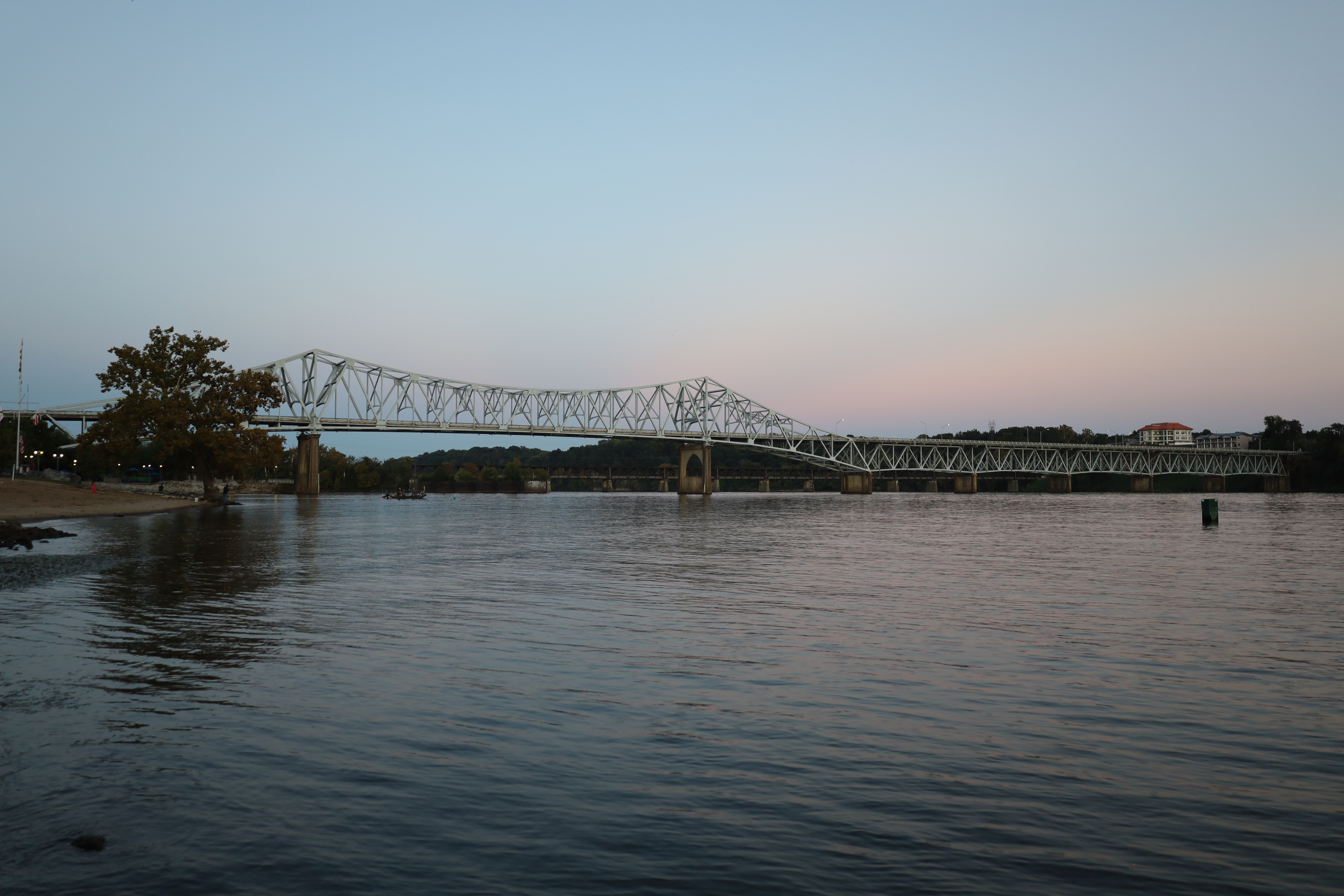
US 43 crosses the Tennessee River on the O'Neal Bridge in Florence, Alabama, pictured in 2025

The three highways head to the north and pass the King Drive-In theater, the oldest, continually-operating theater in the state. They travel northeast through Littleville and then northwest towards Tuscumbia. They have an intersection with US 72 (unsigned SR 2), US 72 Alt., and SR 20. At this intersection, US 72 Alternate ends, while US 72 and SR 20 join the US 43/SR 13/SR 17 concurrency. The five highways continue to the north, briefly travel through Tuscumbia proper before traveling along the Tuscumbia–Muscle Shoals city line. On the Muscle Shoals–Sheffield city line, the highways intersect East 2nd Street, which carries SR 184 east of the intersection. They then pass administration offices of the Tennessee Valley Authority (TVA). Then, they cross over the Tennessee River on the O'Neal Bridge and enter Lauderdale County. The US 43/US 72/SR 13/SR 17/SR 20 concurrency immediately enters Florence. It has an incomplete interchange where SR 20 leaves the concurrency to the west-southwest on Coffee Road. There is no direct access from SR 20 to US 43 north/US 72 east/SR 13 north/SR 17 north. The highways pass near University of North Alabama's main campus and travel to the northeast. There is an interchange with SR 157 (Helton Drive). At this interchange, SR 17 departs the concurrency and heads northwest with SR 157. After that, they intersect SR 133 (Cox Creek Parkway). Just west-southwest of Killen, US 72 continues to the east-northeast, while US 43 and SR 13 head to the northeast. US 43 and SR 13 curve to the north and intersect SR 64. They continue to the north and east until they reach the Tennessee state line, where SR 13 ends.

=== Tennessee ===
US 43 enters Lawrence County and the city limits of Saint Joseph. The unsigned State Route 6 (SR 6) begins at the state line. In the main part of the city, US 43 begins an unsigned concurrency with SR 227 (Iron City Road). They curve to the northeast, leave Saint Joseph, and enter Loretto. There, SR 227 splits off to the southeast onto East Main Street (Lexington Highway). Then, US 43 intersects SR 98 (Rabbit Trail Road) in Leoma. It has an interchange with US 64 (unsigned SR 15; Lawrenceburg Highway) in Lawrenceburg. In downtown Lawrenceburg, US 43 intersects US 64 Bus. (Gaines Street). The highway runs through Lawrenceburg Proper and into the Ethridge City Limits. There are instersections with Ethridge-Redhill Road Tennessee State Route 938 to the West, and Campbellsville Pike Tennessee State Route 940 to the East. The highway begins a curve to the north, crossing the South Fork of the Buffalo River. Shortly after intersecting with the South end of Old Highway 43, the highway crosses over the North Fork of the Buffalo River. Next it intersects with the North end of Old Highway 43 at the junction with SR 240 (Monument Road).

In Maury County, US 43 intersects SR 20, then it intersects with the South end of Lawrenceburg Highway (the former route of Highway 43). After that junction, it passes by Stillhouse Hollow Falls, a Class I Scenic-Recreational State Natural Area (https://www.tn.gov/environment/program-areas/na-natural-areas/natural-areas-middle-region/middle-region/na-na-stillhouse-hollow-falls.html) The highway continues over Big Bigby Creek and to the junction with the North end of Lawrenceburg Highway.

It intersects the southern terminus of SR 243 (South Main Street) in Mount Pleasant. It travels on an overpass over Mt. Joy Road and some railroad tracks. US 43 bypasses downtown by traveling through the western part of the city. It intersects SR 166 (1st Avenue). Then, it has an interchange with SR 243, which also leads to the Maury County Airport. It has an interchange with US 412 (unsigned SR 99) and the western terminus of US 412 Bus. (Hampshire Pike) in Columbia. At this interchange, US 43 and US 412 travel concurrently to the north-northeast. At an interchange with SR 50 (Williamsport Pike), the concurrency briefly re-enters the city before leaving again. The concurrency curves to the east-southeast and has an interchange with SR 7 (Santa Fe Pike). Then, they intersect US 31 and US 412 Bus (Nashville Highway). Here, US 43 ends, US 412 continues to the east-southeast on Bear Creek Pike, and SR 6 turns onto US 31 north.

== History ==
Prior to the completion of Corridor X in western Alabama, US 43 and US 278 shared a concurrency with US 78 between Guin and Hamilton.

=== 1934 proposed expansion ===
U.S. Route 143
- Existed: 1934 (Note: Never signposted)–1934

In 1934 as part of a proposal to eliminate the US 31W and US 31E spilt, US 43 was to be extended north to Hopkinsville, Kentucky on US 31 and modern day US 41A. A highway numbered US 143 was also to be commissioned to replace US 31E to Glasgow, Kentucky. This plan received pushback from the states involved, and the plan was scrapped.

== Future ==
Preliminary talks have indicated that Alabama state officials support a plan to upgrade US 43 to Interstate Highway standards from the Mobile metropolitan area to the I-20/I-59 interchange in Knoxville, Alabama (southwest of Tuscaloosa). No number has been assigned. The plan is estimated to cost roughly $1.6 billion. The project is expected to help the economies of cities in the Black Belt by connecting communities in western Alabama, the Port of Mobile, I-65, and I-20/I-59.

== Major intersections ==
All exits are unnumbered.

State	County	Location	mi	km	Destinations	Notes
Alabama	Mobile	Prichard	0.000	0.000	Telegraph Road south – State Docks Truck Control; SR 13 begins	Continuation past southern terminus; southern end of SR 13 overlap
Alabama	Mobile	Prichard	0.000	0.000	US 90 / US 98 Truck (SR 16) to I-165	Interchange via connector road
Alabama	Mobile	Saraland	4.539	7.305	SR 158 west	Eastern terminus of SR 158
Alabama	Mobile	Saraland	6.574	10.580	SR 213 south (Shelton Beach Road) – Prichard	Northern terminus of SR 213
Alabama	Mobile	Satsuma	10.576	17.020	I-65 – Mobile, Montgomery	I-65 exit 19; parclo interchange
Alabama	Mobile		29.146	46.906	Steel Drive	Interchange
Alabama	Washington	Wagarville	50.406	81.121	SR 56 west – Jackson, Chatom	Eastern terminus of SR 56
Alabama	Tombigbee River		58.956	94.880	Joe C. McCorquodale Bridge	
Alabama	Clarke		59.621	95.951	SR 177 north to Industrial Road – Coastal Alabama Community College, William E. Stewart Jackson Municipal Airport, Paul H. Parham II Jackson Industrial Park	Clockwise terminus of SR 177; former US 43 north
Alabama	Clarke	Jackson	61.101	98.333	SR 69 – Business District, Bishop State Truck Driving Training Facility, Jackson Academy, Legion Field	Interchange via connector roads
Alabama	Clarke	Jackson	62.341	100.328	SR 177 south – Coastal Alabama Community College, Business District, Legion Field	Counterclockwise terminus of SR 177; former US 43 south
Alabama	Clarke	Grove Hill	75.035	120.757	SR 295 north / CR 18 – Historical Downtown, Business District	Southern terminus of SR 295; former US 43 north
Alabama	Clarke	Grove Hill	75.760	121.924	US 84 (SR 12)	Diamond interchange
Alabama	Clarke	Grove Hill	78.267	125.959	SR 295 south – Historical Downtown, Business District	Northern terminus of SR 295; former US 43 south
Alabama	Clarke	Fulton	82.757	133.184	SR 178 east – Fulton Healthcare Clinic	Western terminus of SR 178
Alabama	Clarke	Thomasville	91.080	146.579	SR 154 west (Tallahatta Springs Road)	Eastern terminus of SR 154
Alabama	Clarke	Thomasville	93.087	149.809	SR 5 north – Pine Hill	Southern terminus of SR 5
Alabama	Marengo	Dixons Mills	101.572	163.464	SR 10 – Butler, Pine Hill	
Alabama	Marengo	Linden	118.131	190.113	SR 69 south – Nanafalia	Southern end of SR 69 overlap
Alabama	Marengo	Linden	119.477	192.280	SR 28 east – Thomaston	Southern end of SR 28 overlap
Alabama	Marengo	Linden	119.890	192.944	SR 28 west – Livingston	Northern end of SR 28 overlap
Alabama	Marengo	Providence	122.423	197.021	SR 69 north – Greensboro	Northern end of SR 69 overlap
Alabama	Marengo	Demopolis	134.323	216.172	US 80 east (SR 8) – Selma, Montgomery	Southern end of US 80 overlap
Alabama	Marengo	Demopolis	135.275	217.704	US 80 west (SR 8) – Cuba, Meridian	Northern end of US 80 overlap
Alabama	Black Warrior River		138.290	222.556	William Rufus-King Bridge	
Alabama	Greene	Eutaw	160.423	258.176	SR 14 east – Greensboro, Moundville	Southern end of SR 14 overlap
Alabama	Greene	Eutaw	160.710	258.638	US 11 south (SR 7 south) – Livingston	Southern end of US 11 overlap
Alabama	Greene	Eutaw	160.946	259.017	SR 14 west (Main Street) – Livingston, Aliceville	Northern end of SR 14 overlap
Alabama	Greene	Knoxville	173.626	279.424	I-20 / I-59 – Meridian, Tuscaloosa	I-20/I-59 exit 52
Alabama	Tuscaloosa	Fosters	183.651	295.558	CR 10 / Holley Springs Lane (SR 300) to I-20 / I-59 – Tuscaloosa, Birmingham	I-20/I-59 exit 62
Alabama	Tuscaloosa	Tuscaloosa	194.287	312.675	I-359 / US 11 north (SR 7 north) / SR 69	Northern end of US 11 overlap; I-359 exit 2
Alabama	Tuscaloosa	Tuscaloosa	194.502	313.021	I-359 south / US 11 (SR 7) / SR 69 south To I-20 / I-59	Southern end of SR 69 overlap; northern terminus of I-359
Alabama	Tuscaloosa	Black Warrior River	195.249	314.223	Hugh R. Thomas Bridge	
Alabama	Tuscaloosa	Northport	195.713	314.970	5th Street	Interchange
Alabama	Tuscaloosa	Northport	197.139	317.264	US 82 east (SR 6 east) / SR 69 north – Jasper, Montgomery	Southern end of US 82 overlap; northern end of SR 69 overlap
Alabama	Tuscaloosa	Northport	198.093	318.800	US 82 west / SR 6 west (McFarland Boulevard west) – Gordo, Lake Lurleen State Park	Northern end of US 82 overlap
Alabama	Tuscaloosa	Northport	200.192	322.178	SR 171 north – Fayette	Southern terminus of SR 171
Alabama	Fayette		226.727	364.882	SR 13 north – Eldridge SR 18 east – Berry, Jasper	Northern end of SR 13 overlap; southern end of SR 18 overlap
Alabama	Fayette	Fayette	240.217	386.592	SR 18 west (Columbus Street west) / SR 171 south (2nd Avenue SE) – Vernon, Tuscaloosa	Northern end of SR 18 overlap; southern end of SR 171 overlap
Alabama	Fayette		246.256	396.311	SR 129 north – Glen Allen, Haleyville	Southern terminus of SR 129
Alabama	Fayette	Hubbertville	247.233	397.883	SR 102 east	Western terminus of SR 102
Alabama	Marion	Winfield	260.526	419.276	SR 118 east (Bankhead Highway) / SR 253 north – Jasper, Yampertown	Southern end of SR 118 overlap; southern terminus of SR 253
Alabama	Marion	Guin	266.701	429.214	SR 44 east (7th Street) – Yampertown	Western terminus of SR 44
Alabama	Marion	Guin	267.066	429.801	US 278 west (SR 74) / SR 118 west / SR 142 west – Sulligent, Hamilton	Southern end of US 278 overlap; northern end of SR 118 overlap; eastern terminus of SR 142
Alabama	Marion	Hamilton	275.428	443.258	I-22 / US 78 (SR 4) – Tupelo, Birmingham	Diamond interchange; I-22 exit 16
Alabama	Marion	Hamilton	280.185	450.914	SR 17 south / SR 171 ends – Vernon	Southern end of SR 17 overlap; northern end of SR 171 overlap; northern terminus of SR 171
Alabama	Marion	Hamilton	280.517	451.448	US 278 east to SR 74 / I-22 – Double Springs, Tupelo	Northern end of US 278 concurrency
Alabama	Marion		285.822	459.986	SR 187 north – Hodges	Southern terminus of SR 187
Alabama	Marion	Hackleburg	294.323	473.667	SR 172 to SR 253 south – Hodges, Bear Creek	
Alabama	Franklin	Phil Campbell	304.307	489.735	SR 13 south – Phil Campbell, Haleyville, Tuscaloosa	Southern end of SR 13 overlap
Alabama	Franklin	Russellville	310.871	500.298	SR 24 (Appalachian Development Corridor V) to SR 243 – Double Springs, Moulton, Red Bay	Interchange; serves Russellville Municipal Airport
Alabama	Colbert	Muscle Shoals–Tuscumbia line	327.903	527.709	US 72 west (SR 2 west) – Corinth MS, Tuscumbia US 72 Alt. / SR 20 east – Decatur	Southern end of US 72/SR 20 overlap; western terminus of US 72 Alt.
Alabama	Colbert	Muscle Shoals–Sheffield line	331.231	533.065	SR 184 east (Second Street)	Western terminus of SR 184; serves Northwest Alabama Regional Airport
Alabama	Tennessee River		332.911	535.768	O'Neal Bridge	
Alabama	Lauderdale	Florence	333.658	536.971	SR 20 west – Savannah Tn	Interchange; no northbound entrance; northern end of SR 20 overlap; no access from SR 20 to US 43 north/US 72 east/SR 17 north
Alabama	Lauderdale	Florence	334.9	539.0	Stadium	Interchange; no southbound entrance
Alabama	Lauderdale	Florence	335.496	539.928	SR 157 (Helton Drive) / SR 17 north – Muscle Shoals, Waynesboro Tn, Braly Stadium	Interchange; northern end of SR 17 overlap
Alabama	Lauderdale	Florence	337.819	543.667	SR 133 (Cox Creek Parkway)	Serves Northwest Alabama Regional Airport and North Alabama Medical Center
Alabama	Lauderdale	Killen	342.215	550.742	US 72 east (SR 2) – Joe Wheeler State Park	Northern end of US 72 overlap
Alabama	Lauderdale	Zip City	347.747	559.645	CR 364 west / SR 64 east – Lexington	Eastern terminus of CR 364; western terminus of SR 64
Alabama–Tennessee line			353.077 0.00	568.222 0.00	SR 13 ends TN 6 begins	
Tennessee	Lawrence	St. Joseph	2.34	3.77	SR 227 west – Iron City	Southern end of SR 227 overlap
Tennessee	Lawrence	Loretto	10.35	16.66	SR 227 east	Northern end of SR 227 overlap
Tennessee	Lawrence	Leoma	14.85	23.90	SR 98 south (Rabbit Trail Road) – Five Points, Bonnertown	Northern terminus of SR 98
Tennessee	Lawrence	Lawrenceburg	18.15	29.21	US 64 (SR 15 / Lawrenceburg Highway) – Waynesboro, Pulaski	Interchange
Tennessee	Lawrence	Lawrenceburg	20.62	33.18	US 64 Bus. (Gaines Street)	Provides access to David Crockett State Park
Tennessee	Lawrence		33.10	53.27	SR 240 west (Monument Road) – Summertown, Hohenwald	Eastern terminus of SR 240
Tennessee	Maury	Summertown	34.20	55.04	SR 20 west – Summertown, Hohenwald	Eastern terminus of SR 20
Tennessee	Maury	Mount Pleasant	40.36	64.95	SR 243 north (South Main Street)	Southern terminus of SR 243
Tennessee	Maury	Mount Pleasant	40.96	65.92	Mount Joy Road	Interchange
Tennessee	Maury	Mount Pleasant	42.55	68.48	SR 166 (1st Avenue) – Hampshire	Interchange
Tennessee	Maury	Mount Pleasant	44.85	72.18	SR 243 – Maury County Airport	Interchange
Tennessee	Maury	Ashwood	49.98	80.44	Zion Road	Interchange
Tennessee	Maury	Columbia	50.77	81.71	US 412 west (SR 99 west) / US 412 Bus. east (SR 99 east) – Columbia, Hohenwald, Columbia State Community College, Tennessee Technology Center at Hohenwald	South end of freeway; southern end of US 412 overlap; western terminus of US 412 Bus.
Tennessee	Maury	Columbia	52.04	83.75	SR 50 (Williamsport Pike) – Centerville	
Tennessee	Maury	Columbia	54.22	87.26	Industrial Park Road	
Tennessee	Maury	Columbia	55.90	89.96	SR 7 (Santa Fe Pike) – Dickson, Santa Fe	North end of freeway
Tennessee	Maury	Columbia	57.21	92.07	US 31 north (SR 6 north) – Spring Hill US 412 Bus. west (SR 99 west) – Columbia US 412 east (SR 99 east) to I-65	Northern terminus; northern end of US 412 overlap; highway continues east as US 412 (SR 99)
1.000 mi = 1.609 km; 1.000 km = 0.621 mi: Concurrency terminus; Incomplete access

== See also ==
- U.S. Route 143
