= Tennessee State Route 227 =

State highway in Tennessee, United States

State Route 227
- SR 227 highlighted in red

Route information
- Maintained by TDOT
- Length: 32.3 mi (52.0 km)
- Existed: July 1, 1983–present

Major junctions
- West end: SR 157 at the Alabama state line in Cypress Inn
- SR 13 in Fairview; US 43 in Saint Joseph
- East end: SR 101 at the Alabama state line near Lexington, AL

Location
- Country: United States
- State: Tennessee
- Counties: Wayne, Lawrence

Highway system
- Tennessee State Routes; Interstate; US; State
← SR 226	→ SR 228

State Route 227 (SR 227) is a 32.3-mile-long (52.0 km) east–west state highway in extreme southern Middle Tennessee. It is the only state highway in Tennessee that both begins and ends at the Alabama state line, with one end at Cypress Inn and the other just across the state line from Lexington, Alabama.

== Route description ==
SR 227 begins in Wayne County at the Alabama state line in the Cypress Inn community, where it continues south as Alabama State Route 157 (SR 157). SR 227 immediately makes a sharp right turn at an intersection with Big Cypress Road, which provides access to the Natchez Trace Parkway, before going east through a mix of farmland and wooded areas for several miles to the community of Fairview, where it has a short concurrency with SR 13. It then enters the Highland Rim and winds its way east through mountains to cross into Lawrence County. The highway almost immediately passes through the town of Iron City, where it has an intersection with SR 242 and crosses over Shoal Creek, before going east through mountains to the town of Saint Joseph where it comes to an intersection and becomes concurrent with US 43/SR 6. They head northeast through farmland for a few miles to the town of Loretto, where SR 227 breaks off and turns southeast. SR 227 passes through wooded areas, then very rural farmland, for several miles before coming to the Alabama state line, where it continues into Lexington, Alabama as Alabama State Route 101 (SR 101). Excluding the concurrency with US 43, which is a four-lane undivided highway, the entire route of SR 227 is a two-lane highway.

== Major intersections ==
County	Location	mi	km	Destinations	Notes
Wayne	Cypress Inn	0.0	0.0	SR 157 south (Cloverdale Road) – Cloverdale	Alabama state line; western terminus
Wayne	Cypress Inn			Big Cypress Road to Natchez Trace Parkway – Lutts	Access road to the Natchez Trace Parkway
Wayne	Fairview			SR 13 north (Chisholm Road) – Collinwood	Western end of SR 13 concurrency
Wayne	Fairview			SR 13 south (Chisholm Road) – Zip City, AL, Florence, AL	Eastern end of SR 13 concurrency
Lawrence	Iron City			SR 242 north (Wayland Springs Road) – Westpoint, Lawrenceburg	Southern terminus of SR 242
Lawrence	Iron City			Bridge over Shoal Creek	
Lawrence	Saint Joseph			US 43 south (SR 6 south) – Killen, AL, Florence, AL	Western end of US 43/SR 6 concurrency
Lawrence	Loretto			US 43 north (South Military Street / SR 6 north) – Leoma, Lawrenceburg	Eastern end of US 43/SR 6 concurrency
Lawrence		32.3	52.0	SR 101 south (Wheeler Dam Highway) – Lexington	Alabama state line; eastern terminus
1.000 mi = 1.609 km; 1.000 km = 0.621 mi: Concurrency terminus
