= Alabama State Route 69 =

State highway in Alabama, United States

State Route 69
- SR 69 highlighted in red

Route information
- Maintained by ALDOT
- Length: 280.599 mi (451.580 km)

Major junctions
- South end: SR 177 in Jackson
- US 80 in Prairieville; I-20 / I-59 / I-359 / US 11 / US 43 in Tuscaloosa; I-22 / US 78 / SR 5 / SR 195 / SR 269 in Jasper; I-65 in Dodge City; US 31 / US 278 / SR 157 in Cullman; US 231 in Arab
- North end: US 431 / SR 79 in Guntersville

Location
- Country: United States
- State: Alabama
- Counties: Clarke, Marengo, Hale, Tuscaloosa, Walker, Cullman, Marshall

Highway system
- Alabama State Highway System; Interstate; US; State
← SR 68	→ SR 70

State Route 69 (SR 69) is a 280-mile-long (450 km) state highway that extends from the southwestern to the northeastern parts of the U.S. state of Alabama. The southern terminus of the highway is at an intersection with SR 177 at Jackson. The northern terminus of the highway is at an intersection with US 431/SR 79 at Guntersville.

== Route description ==
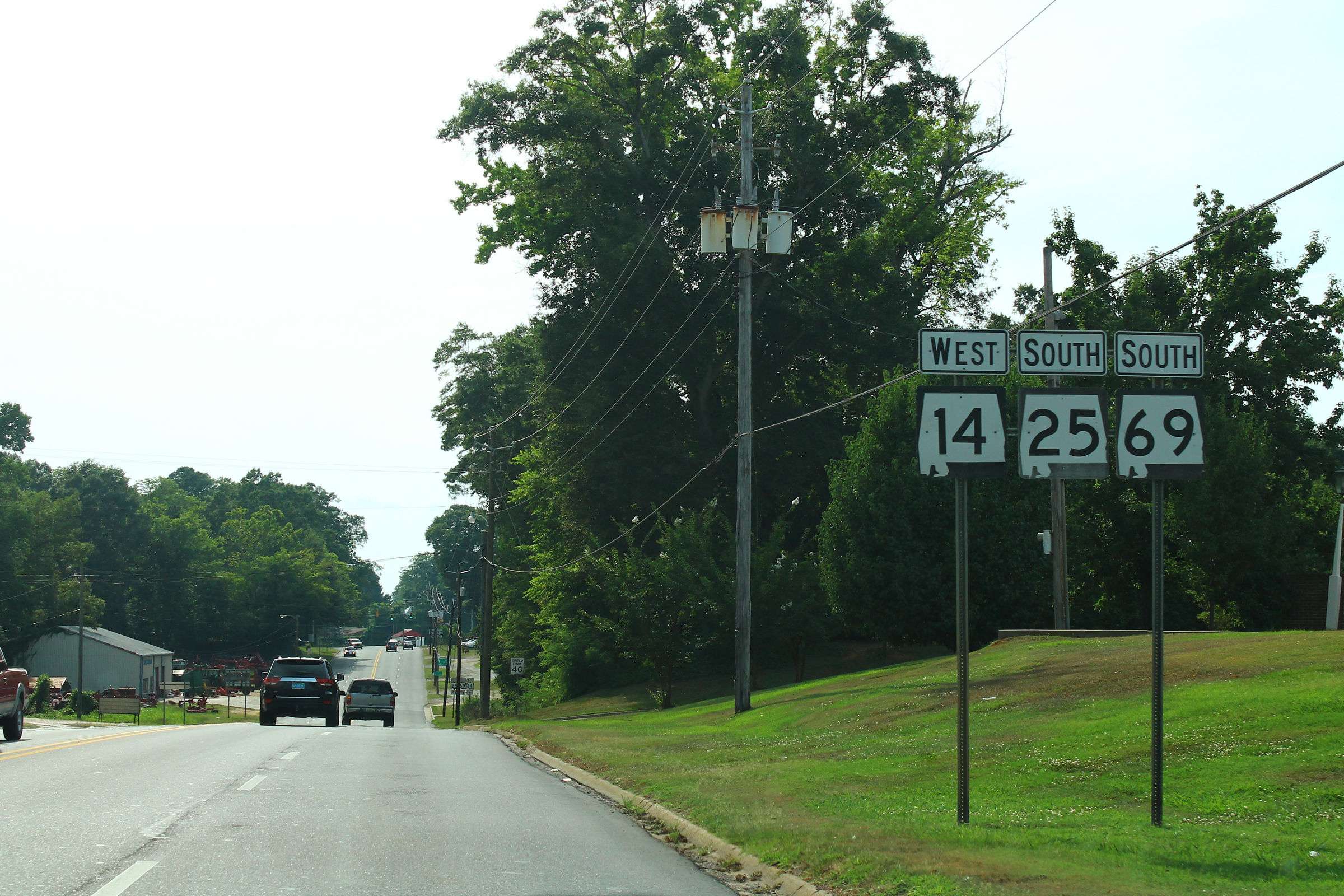
Looking west along State Street in central Greensboro, where SR 69 briefly runs concurrent with SR 14 and SR 25, July 2014

SR 69 has a rather irregular trajectory for much of its length. From its southern terminus at Jackson, the highway heads to the northwest as it travels through Clarke County. In the northern part of the county, the highway turns northeastward as it approaches Linden.

North of Linden, SR 69 assumes a general northward trajectory, traveling through Greensboro as it heads towards Tuscaloosa, the largest city through which the highway travels. At Tuscaloosa, SR 69 travels concurrently with Interstate 359 (I-359) north of the interchange of I-359 and I-20/I-59. I-359/SR 69 shares a wrong-way concurrency with US 11 as they head into downtown Tuscaloosa.

Interestingly, SR 69 intersects US 43 four times.

North of Tuscaloosa and Northport, SR 69 continues northward as it heads towards Jasper. At Jasper, SR 69 and SR 5 share a wrong-way concurrency along the former route of US 78.

North of Jasper, SR 69 resumes its northeastward trajectory as it heads towards Cullman. South of Cullman, the highway has an interchange with I-65 and shares a 5-mile-long (8.0 km) concurrency with the interstate highway. SR 69 is one of only three signed state highways that is concurrent with a stretch of interstate highway in Alabama. (SR 5, along with US 11, are concurrent with I-20/I-59 between West Blocton and Bessemer, and SR 14 is concurrent with I-65 between Prattville and Millbrook).

As SR 69 heads northward from Cullman, it continues its northeastward orientation. It passes through Arab before turning eastward as it approaches its terminus at Guntersville.

== Future ==
In 2024, ALDOT will began work to convert the US 11 (Skyland Boulevard)/SR 69 intersection into a single-point urban interchange (SPUI) in order to improve traffic flow. The project, which is a joint effort between the Tuscaloosa Road Improvement Commission and ALDOT, is expected to cost $89 million and take about three years to complete.

== Major intersections ==
County	Location	mi	km	Destinations	Notes
Clarke	Jackson	0.000	0.000	SR 177 (College Avenue) – Coastal Alabama Community College, Legion Field	Southern terminus; former US 43
Clarke	Jackson	0.632	1.017	US 43 (SR 13) – Mobile	Interchange
Clarke	Coffeeville	22.258	35.821	US 84 east (SR 12 east) – Grove Hill	Southern end of US 84/SR 12 concurrency
Clarke	Coffeeville	22.568	36.320	US 84 west (SR 12 west) – Silas	Northern end of US 84/SR 12 concurrency
Clarke	Coffeeville	24.679	39.717	SR 154 east – Scotch WMA	Western terminus of SR 154
Marengo	Nanafalia	54.485	87.685	SR 10 – Butler, Camden	
Marengo	Myrtlewood	65.262	105.029	SR 114 west – Myrtlewood	Eastern terminus of SR 114
Marengo	Linden	73.803	118.774	US 43 south (SR 13 south) – Thomasville, Grove Hill	Southern end of US 43/SR 13 concurrency
Marengo	Linden	75.149	120.941	SR 28 east – Thomaston	Southern end of SR 28 concurrency
Marengo	Linden	75.562	121.605	SR 28 west – Livingston	Northern end of SR 28 concurrency
Marengo	Providence	78.095	125.682	US 43 north (SR 13 north) – Demopolis	Northern end of US 43/SR 13 concurrency
Hale		91.752	147.661	US 80 west (SR 8 west) – Demopolis	Southern end of US 80/SR 8 concurrency
Hale	Prairieville	92.495	148.856	US 80 east (SR 8 east) – Uniontown	Northern end of US 80/SR 8 concurrency
Hale	Greensboro	106.910	172.055	SR 25 south – Faunsdale	Southern end of SR 25 concurrency
Hale	Greensboro	107.765	173.431	SR 14 west – Eutaw	Southern end of SR 14 concurrency
Hale	Greensboro	108.114	173.993	SR 14 east – Marion	Northern end of SR 14 concurrency
Hale	Greensboro	108.387	174.432	SR 25 north	Northern end of SR 25 concurrency
Hale		124.039	199.621	SR 60 west – Akron	Eastern terminus of SR 60
Tuscaloosa	Tuscaloosa	143.008	230.149	US 11 north (Skyland Boulevard/SR 7 north) to US 82 – Tuscaloosa	Southern end of US 11/SR 7 concurrency
Tuscaloosa	Tuscaloosa	143.396	230.773	I-20 / I-59 – Meridian, Birmingham I-359 begins	Southern terminus of I-359; southern end of I-359 concurrency; I-20/I-59 exit 71; I-359 exit 0
Tuscaloosa	Tuscaloosa	144.124	231.945	35th Street / Kauloosa Avenue	I-359 exit 1
Tuscaloosa	Tuscaloosa	145.602	234.324	US 11 south / US 43 south (15th Street/SR 7 south/SR 13 north) / I-359 ends – Stillman College	Northern terminus of I-359; northern end of US 11/SR 7 concurrency; south end of US 43/SR 13 concurrency; I-359 exit 2 (northbound)
Tuscaloosa	Tuscaloosa	146.278	235.412	University Boulevard	University of Alabama
Tuscaloosa	Northport	147.028	236.619	Northport, Airport (5th Street)	Interchange
Tuscaloosa	Northport	148.454	238.914	US 43 north / US 82 (McFarland Boulevard/SR 13 north/SR 6) – Fayette, Columbus, Lake Lurleen State Park, Airport, toll bridge to I-20 / I-59	Northern end of US 43/SR 13 concurrency
Walker		188.348	303.117	SR 18 west – Berry, Fayette	Eastern terminus of SR 18
Walker		197.584	317.981	SR 124 west – Carbon Hill	Eastern terminus of SR 124
Walker	Jasper	198.602	319.619	I-22 / US 78 (SR 4) – Birmingham, Tupelo	I-22 exit 61
Walker	Jasper	200.512	322.693	SR 269 south to I-22 – Parrish	Northern terminus of SR 269
Walker	Jasper	202.667	326.161	SR 118 west	Eastern terminus of SR 118
Walker	Jasper	203.992	328.293	SR 5 north to SR 195 / SR 257 – Double Springs, Haleyville, Walker County Airport	Interchange; southern end of SR 5 concurrency
Walker	Jasper	207.285	333.593	SR 5 south to I-22 – Birmingham	Northern end of SR 5 concurrency
Cullman	Wilburn	222.416	357.944	SR 91 north	Southern terminus of SR 91
Cullman	Dodge City	235.217	378.545	I-65 south – Birmingham	Southern end of I-65 concurrency; SR 69 south follows exit 299
Cullman	Good Hope	239.261	385.053	I-65 north – Huntsville, Good Hope	Northern end of I-65 concurrency; SR 69 north follows exit 304
Cullman	Cullman	242.961	391.008	US 31 south (SR 3 south) – Birmingham	Southern end of US 31/SR 3 concurrency
Cullman	Cullman	244.174	392.960	US 31 north (2nd Avenue Southwest/SR 3 north) / US 278 west (3rd Street Southwest/SR 74 west) to SR 157 – Double Springs	Northern end of US 31/SR 3 concurrency; southern end of US 278/SR 74 concurrency
Cullman	East Point	247.236	397.888	US 278 east (SR 74 east) – Gadsden	Northern end of US 278/SR 74 concurrency
Cullman	Cullman	247.949	399.035	SR 157 to I-65 / US 31 north / US 278 east	
Cullman	Baileyton	261.860	421.423	SR 67 – Decatur, Gadsden	
Marshall	Arab	267.335	430.234	US 231 (SR 53) – Huntsville, Blountsville	Interchange
Marshall	Guntersville	280.530	451.469	US 431 south / SR 79 south (SR 1/Gunter Avenue)	One-way pair
Marshall	Guntersville	280.599	451.580	US 431 north / SR 79 north (SR 1/Blount Avenue) to SR 227	Northern terminus; one-way pair
1.000 mi = 1.609 km; 1.000 km = 0.621 mi: Concurrency terminus
