= Linden High School =

Linden High School may refer to:

- Linden High School (Alabama)
- Linden High School (California)
- Linden High School (Linden, Wisconsin), listed on the NRHP in Iowa County, Wisconsin
- Linden High School (Michigan)
- Linden High School (New Jersey)

== See also ==
- Linden-McKinley High School, Columbus, Ohio
- Linden School (disambiguation)
- Lynden High School, Washington
- Lyndon School (disambiguation)
