= Tennessee State Route 98 =

State highway in Tennessee, United States

State Route 98
- Rabbit Trail Road
- SR 98 highlighted in red

Route information
- Maintained by TDOT
- Length: 11.73 mi (18.88 km)

Major junctions
- South end: CR 89 at the Alabama state line in Bonnertown
- North end: US 43 in Leoma

Location
- Country: United States
- State: Tennessee
- Counties: Lawrence

Highway system
- Tennessee State Routes; Interstate; US; State
← SR 97	→ SR 99

State Route 98 (SR 98) is a north–south state highway located entirely in Lawrence County in Middle Tennessee. Its northern terminus is a junction with US 43 (SR 6) in Leoma, and its southern terminus is at the Alabama state line.

== Route description ==
SR 98 passes mostly through rural farmland as a two-lane highway for its entire length. About 7.6 miles (12.2 km) south of Leoma, it passes through the community of Five Points. It passes through Bonnertown immediately before crossing into Alabama. It is known as Rabbit Trail Road for its entire length.

== Major intersections ==
The entire route is in Lawrence County.

Location	mi	km	Destinations	Notes
Bonnertown	0.0	0.0	CR 89 south (Betty Highway) to SR 64 – Anderson	Alabama state line; southern terminus
Leoma	11.73	18.88	US 43 (SR 6) – Loretto, Lawrenceburg	Northern terminus
1.000 mi = 1.609 km; 1.000 km = 0.621 mi
