= Alabama State Route 154 =

State highway in Alabama, United States

State Route 154

Route information
- Maintained by ALDOT
- Length: 29.480 mi (47.443 km)

Major junctions
- West end: SR 69 north or Coffeeville
- East end: US 43

Location
- Country: United States
- State: Alabama
- Counties: Clarke

Highway system
- Alabama State Highway System; Interstate; US; State
← SR 153	→ SR 155

State Route 154 (SR 154) is a 29.480-mile (47.443 km) state highway that serves as an east–west connection between Coffeeville and Thomasville through Clarke County. SR 154 intersects SR 69 at its western terminus and US 43 at its eastern terminus.

== Route description ==
SR 154 begins at an intersection with SR 69 north of Coffeeville. From this point, SR 154 follows a meandering east-to-northeast course through central Clarke County en route to its eastern terminus at US 43/SR 13 in Thomasville.

== Major intersections ==
The entire route is in Clarke County.

Location	mi	km	Destinations	Notes
Coffeeville	0.0	0.0	SR 69 – Coffeeville, Jackson, Myrtlewood	Western terminus
Thomasville	29.480	47.443	US 43 (SR 13) – Grove Hill, Linden	Eastern terminus
1.000 mi = 1.609 km; 1.000 km = 0.621 mi
