= Alabama State Route 178 =

State highway in Alabama, United States

State Route 178

Route information
- Maintained by ALDOT
- Length: 1.956 mi (3.148 km)

Major junctions
- West end: US 43 at Fulton
- East end: Main Street in Fulton

Location
- Country: United States
- State: Alabama
- Counties: Clarke

Highway system
- Alabama State Highway System; Interstate; US; State
| ← SR 177 | → SR 179 |

State Route 178 (SR 178) is a 1.956-mile-long (3.148 km) route in Clarke County in the southwestern part of the state. The western terminus of the route is at its junction with US 43 north of Grove Hill. The route ends at the city center of Fulton.

== Route description ==
SR 178 is a 2-mile-long (3.2 km) spur of US 43. Traveling east from US 43, the route travels along a two-lane road, connecting the small town of Fulton to the U.S. highway.

== Major intersections ==
The entire route is in Fulton, Clarke County.

| mi | km | Destinations | Notes |
|---|---|---|---|
| 0.000 | 0.000 | US 43 (SR 13) – Grove Hill, Thomasville | Western terminus |
| 1.956 | 3.148 | Main Street | Eastern terminus |
1.000 mi = 1.609 km; 1.000 km = 0.621 mi
