= Linden School (disambiguation) =

Linden School is a public school in Malden, Massachusetts, United States.

Linden School may also refer to:

- The Linden School, Toronto, Ontario, Canada
- Linden Lodge School for the Blind, Wimbledon, England
- Linden High School (disambiguation)

== United States ==
- Linden City Schools, Linden, Alabama
- Linden Community Schools, Genesee County, Michigan
- Linden Public Schools, Linden, New Jersey
- Linden Hall (school), Lititz, Pennsylvania
- Linden Avenue School, Pittsburgh, Pennsylvania
- Linden-Kildare High School, Linden, Texas

== See also ==
- Linden (disambiguation)
- Lynden High School, Lynden, Washington
- Lyndon School (disambiguation)
