= Alabama State Route 295 =

State highway in Alabama, United States

State Route 295

Route information
- Maintained by ALDOT
- Length: 3.185 mi (5.126 km)

Major junctions
- South end: US 43 in Grove Hill
- US 84 in Grove Hill
- North end: US 43 in Grove Hill

Location
- Country: United States
- State: Alabama
- Counties: Clarke

Highway system
- Alabama State Highway System; Interstate; US; State
← SR 293	→ SR 297

State Route 295 (SR 295) is a 3.185-mile (5.126 km) state highway that serves the central areas of Grove Hill in central Clarke County. SR 295 intersects US 43 at both its southern and northern termini.

== Route description ==
SR 295 begins at its intersection with US 43 just south of Grove Hill. The route progresses in a northerly direction past the Grove Hill Memorial Hospital just prior to reaching its intersection with US 84. SR 295 continues in its northerly track through the central business district of Grove Hill prior to intersecting US 43 at its northern terminus north of the town.

== History ==
The entire route of SR 295 is the former alignment of US 43 prior to the 4-Lane bypass being built to the west.

== Major intersections ==
The entire route is in Grove Hill, Clarke County.

mi	km	Destinations	Notes
0.000	0.000	US 43 (SR 13) / CR 18 west	Southern terminus; south end of CR 18 concurrency; road continues west as CR 18
0.047	0.076	CR 18 east (Love Road)	North end of CR 18 concurrency
0.830	1.336	US 84 (SR 12) to US 43 – Coffeeville, Monroeville	Serves Grove Hill Municipal Airport
3.185	5.126	US 43 (SR 13)	Northern terminus
1.000 mi = 1.609 km; 1.000 km = 0.621 mi: Concurrency terminus
