= Lyndon B. Johnson High School =

Lyndon B. Johnson High School may refer to:

- Lyndon B. Johnson High School (Austin, Texas), in Austin, Texas
- Lyndon B. Johnson High School (Johnson City, Texas), in Johnson City, Texas
- Lyndon B. Johnson High School (Laredo, Texas), in Laredo, Texas

== See also ==
- LBJ School (disambiguation)
- Lyndon Institute, a private high school in Lyndon, Vermont
- Lyndon School (disambiguation)
