= Alabama State Route 269 =

State highway in Alabama, United States

State Route 269

Route information
- Maintained by ALDOT
- Length: 41.524 mi (66.826 km)

Major junctions
- South end: Avenue V in Birmingham
- I-22 / US 78 / SR 4 near Jasper
- North end: SR 69 in Jasper

Location
- Country: United States
- State: Alabama
- Counties: Jefferson, Walker

Highway system
- Alabama State Highway System; Interstate; US; State
← SR 265	→ SR 271

State Route 269 (SR 269) is a 41-mile-long (66 km) route that extends northwestward from Birmingham to Jasper. The route runs west of Interstate 22 (I-22) and roughly parallels that route. Other towns along the route include Maytown, Sylvan Springs, and Parrish.

== Route Description ==
The southern terminus of SR 269 is at the junction with I-20/I-59 at Exit 120 in western Birmingham. The route leads through the Ensley community along 20th Street, passing by the former U.S. Steel Ensley works. After leaving Birmingham, the route leads through several small communities in western Jefferson County into Walker County. The northern terminus of the route is at its junction with SR 69 west of Jasper.

== Major intersections ==
County	Location	mi	km	Destinations	Notes
Jefferson	Birmingham	0.0	0.0	Avenue V	Southern terminus; end state maintenance
Jefferson	Birmingham	0.190	0.306	I-20 / I-59 – Birmingham, Tuscaloosa	I-20/59 Exit 120
Walker	Jasper	39.779	64.018	I-22 / US 78 (SR 4) – Birmingham, Tupelo	I-22 Exit 63
Walker	Jasper	41.524	66.826	SR 69 (20th Street W/Elliot Boulevard) – Dodge City, Oakman	Northern terminus
1.000 mi = 1.609 km; 1.000 km = 0.621 mi
