= Alabama State Route 177 =

State highway in Alabama, United States

State Route 177

Route information
- Maintained by ALDOT
- Length: 5.160 mi (8.304 km)

Major junctions
- CW end: US 43 near Jackson
- SR 69 in Jackson
- CCW end: US 43 in Jackson

Location
- Country: United States
- State: Alabama
- Counties: Clarke

Highway system
- Alabama State Highway System; Interstate; US; State
← SR 176	→ SR 178

State Route 177 (SR 177), also known as College Avenue, is a 5.160-mile-long (8.304 km) route in Jackson in the southwestern part of the state. Both its southern and northern termini are at separate intersections with US 43 in Jackson.

== Route description ==
Prior to 1970, US 43 passed through Jackson. With the completion of a by-pass to the west of the city, US 43 was moved to the new roadway, and SR 177 was designated along the former U.S. Highway. SR 177 also serves as the southern terminus of SR 69, one of the longest state routes in Alabama.

== Major intersections ==
The entire route is in Clarke County.

Location	mi	km	Destinations	Notes
	0.000	0.000	US 43 (SR 13) – Mobile, Grove Hill	Clockwise terminus
Jackson	3.771	6.069	SR 69 north (Coffeeville Road)	Southern terminus of SR 69
Jackson	5.160	8.304	US 43 (SR 13)	Counterclockwise terminus
1.000 mi = 1.609 km; 1.000 km = 0.621 mi
