= Lyndon School =

Lyndon School may refer to:

- Lyndon School, Solihull, West Midlands, UK

== See also ==
- Lynden High School, Lynden, Washington
- Lyndon Academy, Woodstock, Georgia
- Lyndon Institute, Lyndon, Vermont
- Lyndon State College, Lyndon, Vermont
- LBJ School (disambiguation)
- Linden School (disambiguation)
- Lyndon (disambiguation)
- Lyndon B. Johnson High School (disambiguation)
