= Don Leslie Michael =

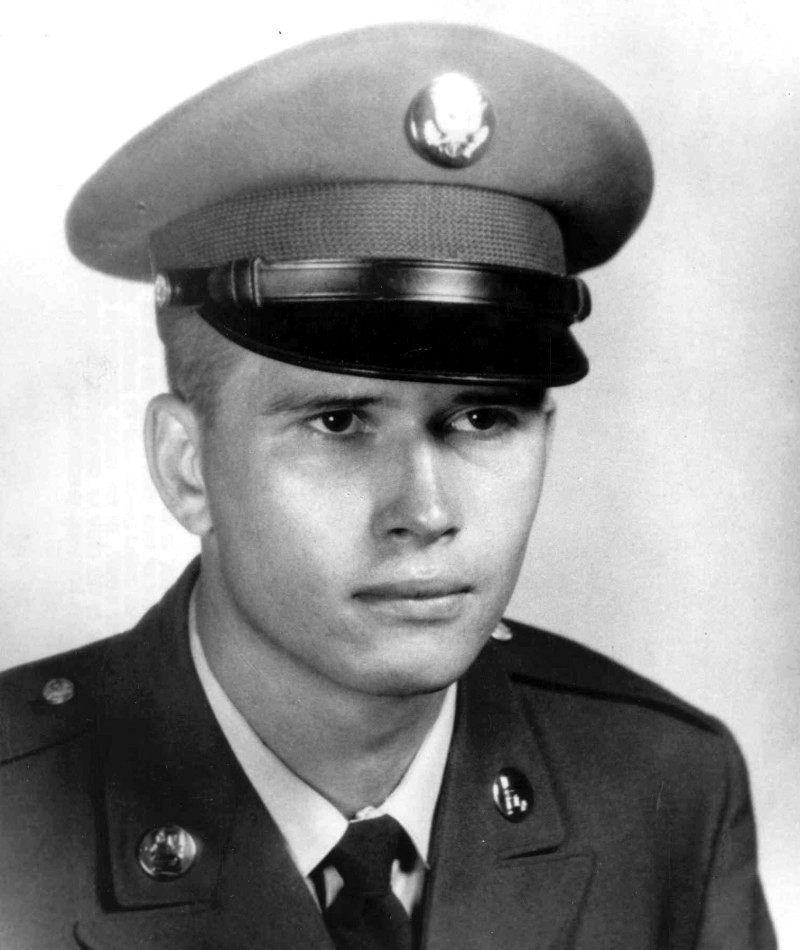
- Donald L. Michael, Medal of Honor Recipient
- Born: July 31, 1947; Florence, Alabama, US
- Died: April 8, 1967 (aged 19); Republic of Vietnam
- Burial place: Mount Pleasant Baptist Church, Lexington, Alabama
- Military career
- Allegiance: United States
- Branch: United States Army
- Service years: 1966–1967
- Rank: Specialist Four
- Units: 503rd Infantry Regiment, 173rd Airborne Brigade
- Conflicts: Vietnam War †
- Awards: Medal of Honor; Army Commendation Medal; Purple Heart

Don Leslie Michael (July 31, 1947 – April 8, 1967) was a United States Army soldier and a recipient of the United States military's highest decoration—the Medal of Honor—for his actions in the Vietnam War.

== Biography ==
Michael joined the Army from Montgomery, Alabama in 1966, and by April 8, 1967, was serving as a Specialist Four in Company C, 4th Battalion, 503d Infantry, 173d Airborne Brigade. On that day, in the Republic of Vietnam, he single-handedly destroyed a Viet Cong bunker and was then mortally wounded while chasing the retreating enemy soldiers. For his actions, he was posthumously awarded the Medal of Honor.

Michael, aged 19 at his death, was buried at Mount Pleasant Baptist Church, Lexington, Alabama.

== Medal of Honor citation ==
Specialist Michael's official Medal of Honor citation reads:

For conspicuous gallantry and intrepidity at the risk of his life above and beyond the call of duty. Specialist Four Michael, U.S. Army, distinguished himself while serving with Company C. Spec. Michael was part of a platoon which was moving through an area of suspected enemy activity. While the rest of the platoon stopped to provide security, the squad to which Spec. Michael was assigned moved forward to investigate signs of recent enemy activity. After moving approximately 125 meters, the squad encountered a single Viet Cong soldier. When he was fired upon by the squad's machine gunner, other Viet Cong opened fire with automatic weapons from a well-concealed bunker to the squad's right front. The volume of enemy fire was so withering as to pin down the entire squad and halt all forward movement. Realizing the gravity of the situation, Spec. Michael exposed himself to throw 2 grenades, but failed to eliminate the enemy position. From his position on the left flank, Spec. Michael maneuvered forward with 2 more grenades until he was within 20 meters of the enemy bunkers, when he again exposed himself to throw 2 grenades, which failed to detonate. Undaunted, Spec. Michael made his way back to the friendly positions to obtain more grenades. With 2 grenades in hand, he again started his perilous move towards the enemy bunker, which by this time was under intense artillery fire from friendly positions. As he neared the bunker, an enemy soldier attacked him from a concealed position. Spec. Michael killed him with his rifle and, in spite of the enemy fire and the exploding artillery rounds, was successful in destroying the enemy positions. Spec. Michael took up pursuit of the remnants of the retreating enemy. When his comrades reached Spec. Michael, he had been mortally wounded. His inspiring display of determination and courage saved the lives of many of his comrades and successfully eliminated a destructive enemy force. Spec. Michael's actions were in keeping with the highest traditions of the military service and reflect the utmost credit upon himself and the U.S. Army.

== See also ==
- List of Medal of Honor recipients
- List of Medal of Honor recipients for the Vietnam War
