= G.T. Wilburn Grist Mill =

Mill in Tennessee, United States

Coordinates: 35°07′49.9″N 87°13′04.0″W

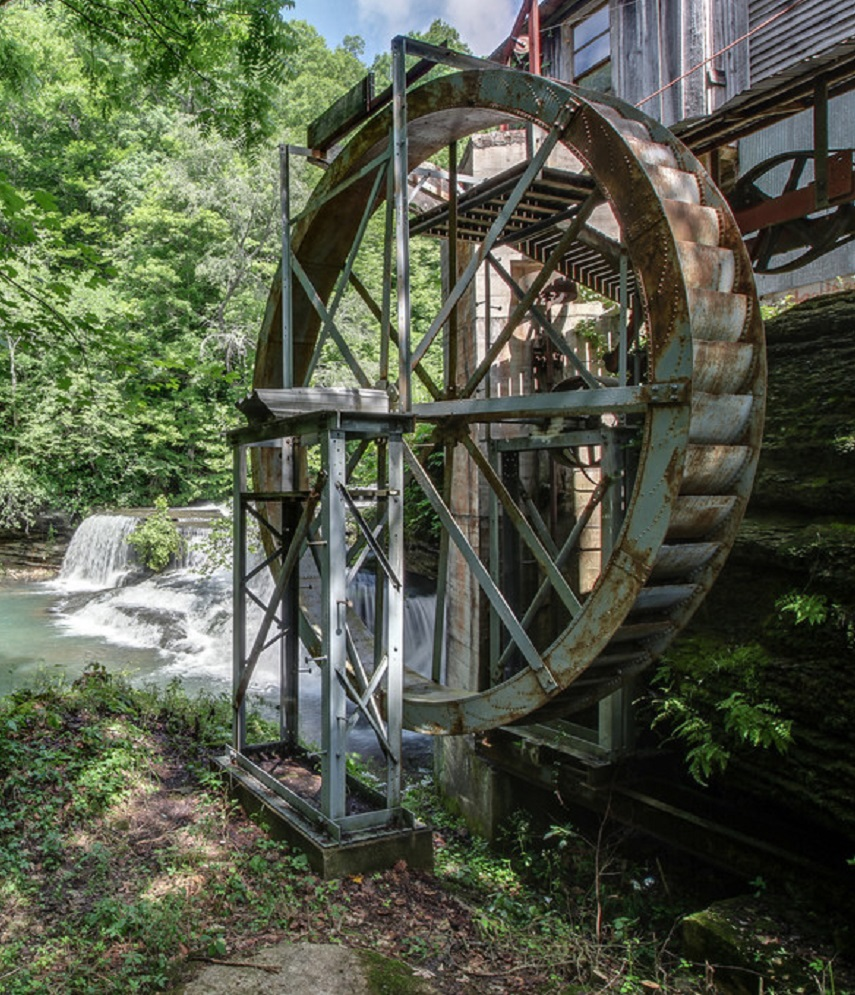
G.T. Wilburn Grist Mill Water Wheel

The G.T. Wilburn Grist Mill is in the Fall River community, in Leoma, Tennessee. Construction on the original mill began in 1823, and it served alongside a general store as the center of the settlement in the Clear Creek Valley.

== Geography ==
Its elevation is 774 feet. Fall River appears on the Bodenham U.S. Geological Survey Map. Lawrence County is in the Central Time Zone. Fall River lies within the (931) area code.

Fall River is a community located within the region of Leoma, Tennessee. The population is not reported but is believed to be approximately 300. Leoma is an unincorporated community located in Lawrence County, Tennessee.

Lawrence County, Tennessee, is a county located in the U.S. state of Tennessee. As of the 2013 census, the population was 41,990. Its county seat and largest city is Lawrenceburg, Tennessee.

The nearest city with population of 200,000 or more is Nashville, Tennessee. It is approximately 76 miles north and has a population of 609,644 as of 2011.

The coordinates are 35°07'49.9"N 87°13'04.0"W.

The mill is located just 13 miles from the David Crockett State Park in Lawrenceburg, Tennessee.

Mount Zion United Methodist Church is a historic church in Lawrence County, Tennessee, near the Fall River community.

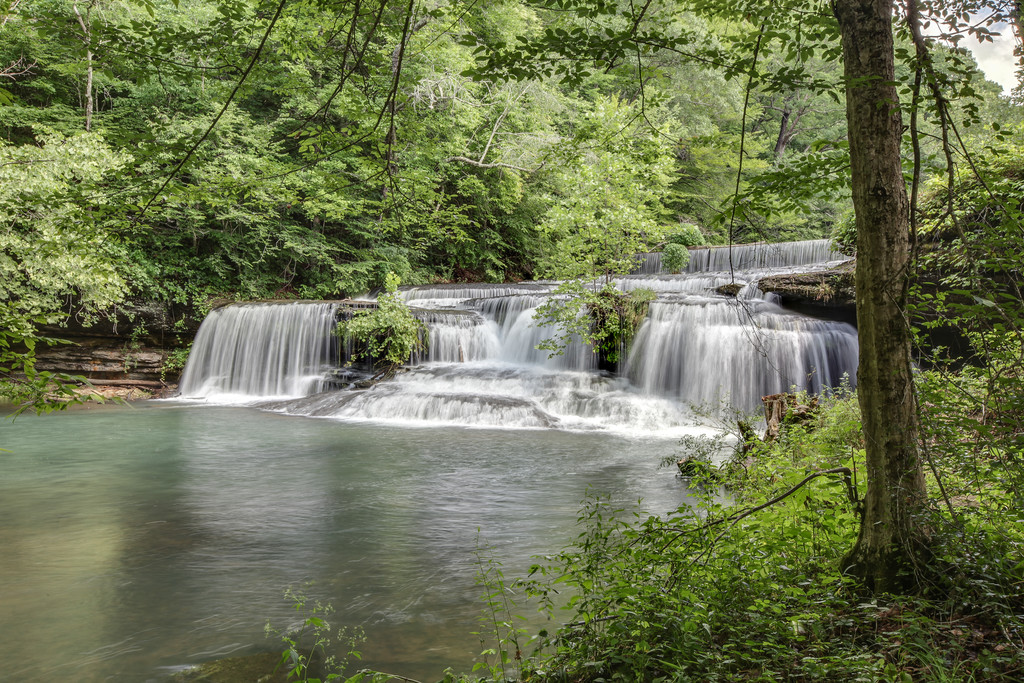
The falls of Clear Creek located in the community of Fall River, Tennessee.

== History ==
The mill and general store served as the center of the Fall River settlement in the Clear Creek Valley in 1823. As the settlement grew and prospered, two churches, a school, a blacksmith shop, a tannery, a timber sawmill, a sorghum mill, and a cemetery were also built. For the next 130 years, the mill, general store and the home place served many needs. In addition to grinding wheat, corn and livestock feed, the store served as a post office, restaurant, operating theatre, judges' court room, voting place, political speaking place, library, boxing matches, horseshoe pitching tournaments, checkers tournaments, circuit church and almost everything else one could imagine prosperous Clear Creek Valley. The lives of many of the Valley's folk were shattered, but as soon as the war ended they went to work rebuilding the once proud Fall River community that embodied the true pioneer spirit of the times.

In 1862, at the beginning of the Civil War, the Union Army raided through middle Tennessee and following a "scorched earth" policy, they burned the mill to the ground. The mill owner and his family's lives were spared, but it negatively impacted the Fall River community that embodied the true pioneer spirit of the times.

Twenty years later, in 1885, the first family members of the current owners of the Fall River community properties arrived and infused new cutting technologies and equipment for wheat and corn grinding. They built a dam across the Clear Creek at the head of the bluffs creating a large thirty-acre millpond that would allow the mill to operate 24/7 even when the creek was low during drought seasons. Fall River was once again on the rise and its success helped revitalize and stabilize the Clear Creek Valley for the next 50 years.

In 1914, G. T. Wilburn (the second generation of current owners) took over the management of the mill and the general store. Under his guidance and stewardship, the mills' productivity grew. His ability to adapt paired with his acclaimed knowledge of how to grind the best wheat and corn products brought regional fame to the mill. It also brought new customers from a fifty-mile radius as the Henry Ford automobile and truck ownership grew in 1924 G.T. His wife, Florence bought out the other family members and dedicated their lives to the Fall River community.

== Timeline ==
While its completion date is unknown, construction on the original water-driven mill began in 1823. It was originally owned by John A. Hagan. Around 40 years later, the Union Army burned the mill down.

In 1865, the Hagan family began to rebuild the mill. Five years later, it was sold to the Scott family, and then the White family in 1885. The White family installed a dam and water turbine that was used to grind fine flour.

In 1909, G.T. Wilburn, an extended member of the White family, was hired to managed the mill and its associated country store. Wilburn purchased the mill, store, farm house, barn, rental. house, and the accompanying 15 acres in 1924. It was subsequently renamed to the G.T. Wilburn and Son's Mill and General Store.

== Photo gallery ==
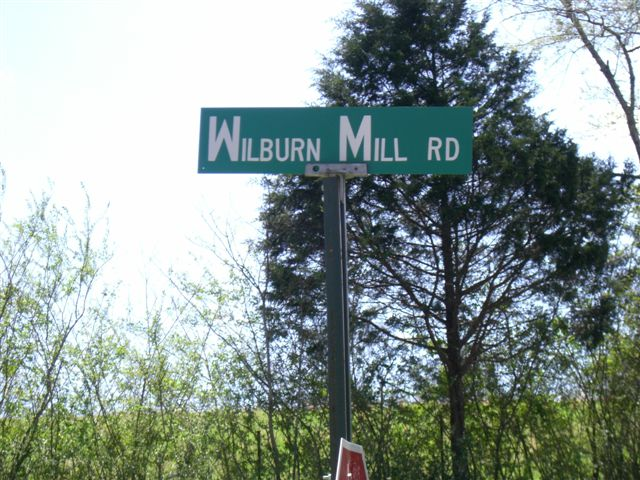
Wilburn Mill Road Sign, Fall River Community, Tennessee

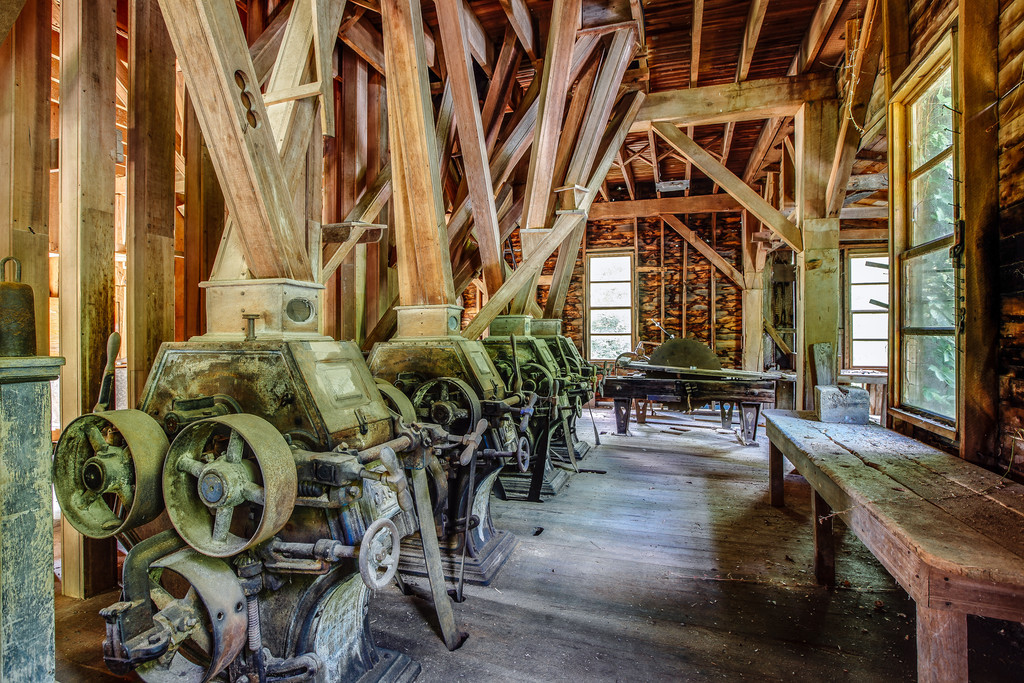
Machinery located inside the G.T. Wilburn Grist Mill.

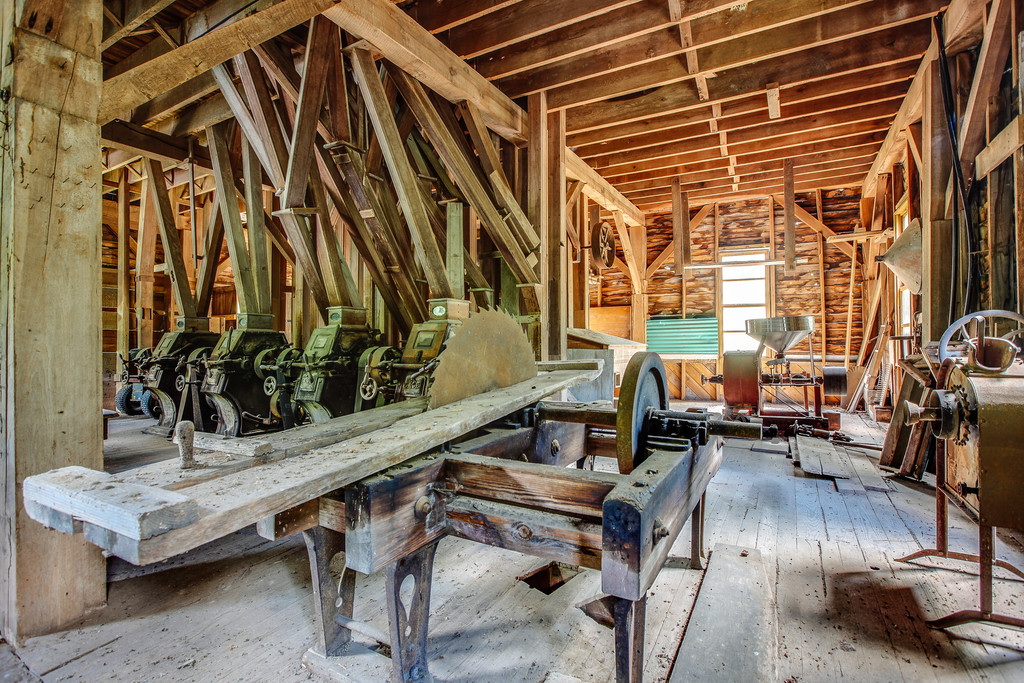
Milling machinery located inside the G.T. Wilburn Grist Mill.

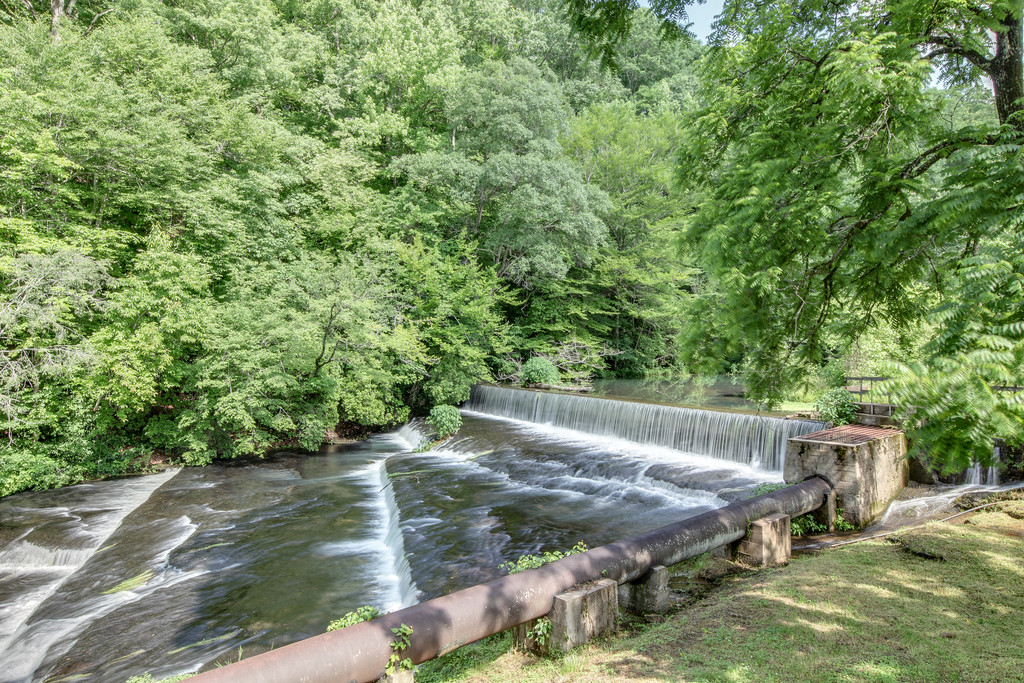
The falls at the Fall River Community.

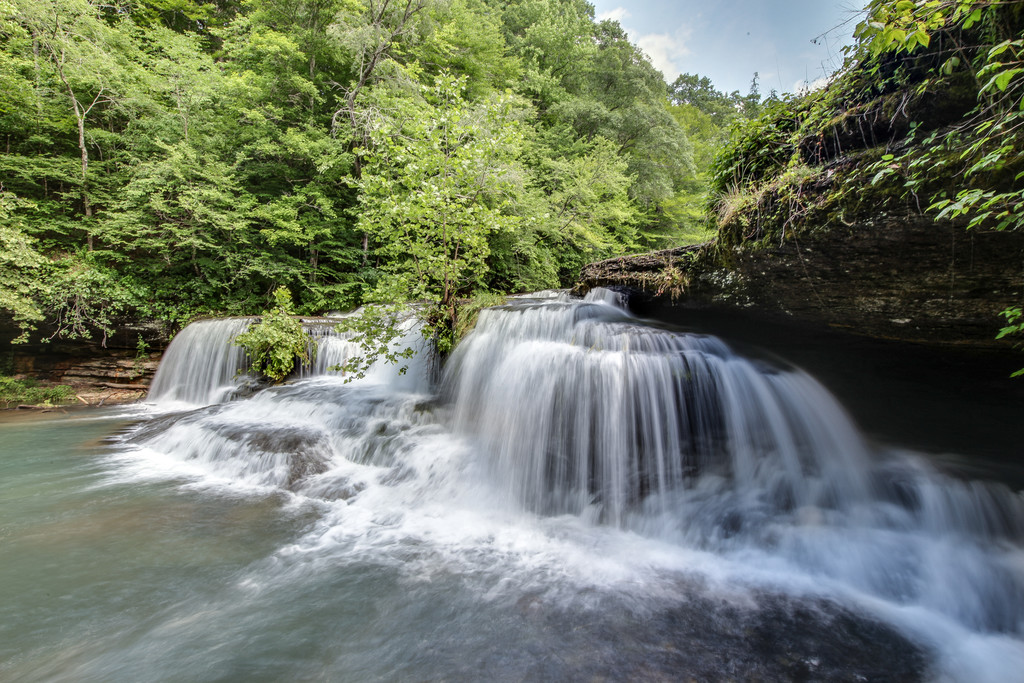
The drop of the falls on Clear Creek at Fall River Community, TN. This was a local bathing shower.

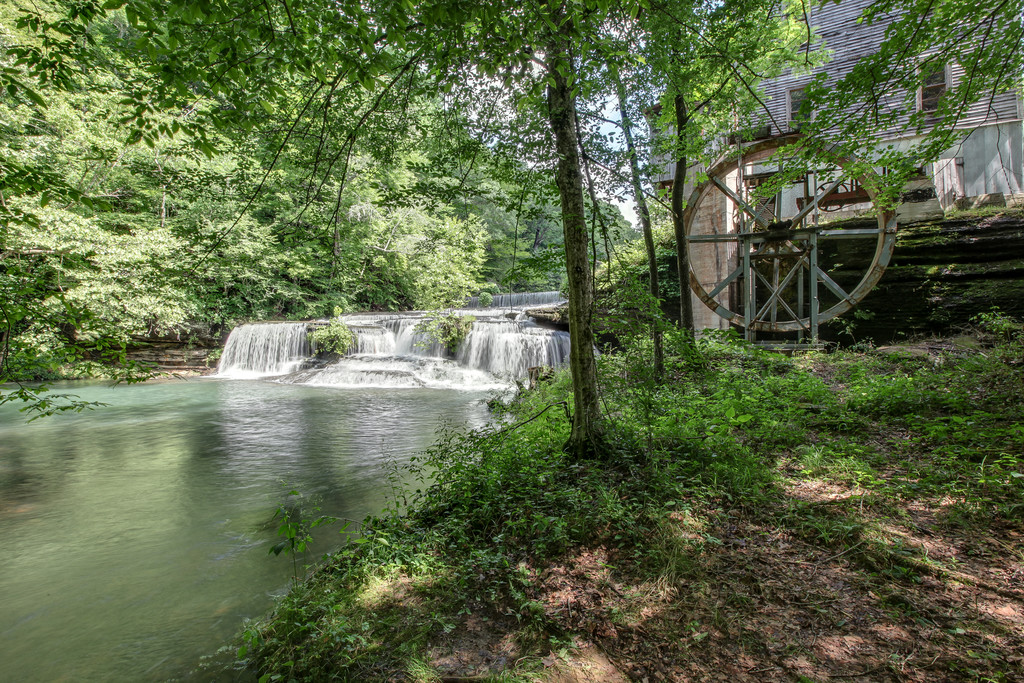
The G.T. Wilburn Grist Mill as it sits on the falls.

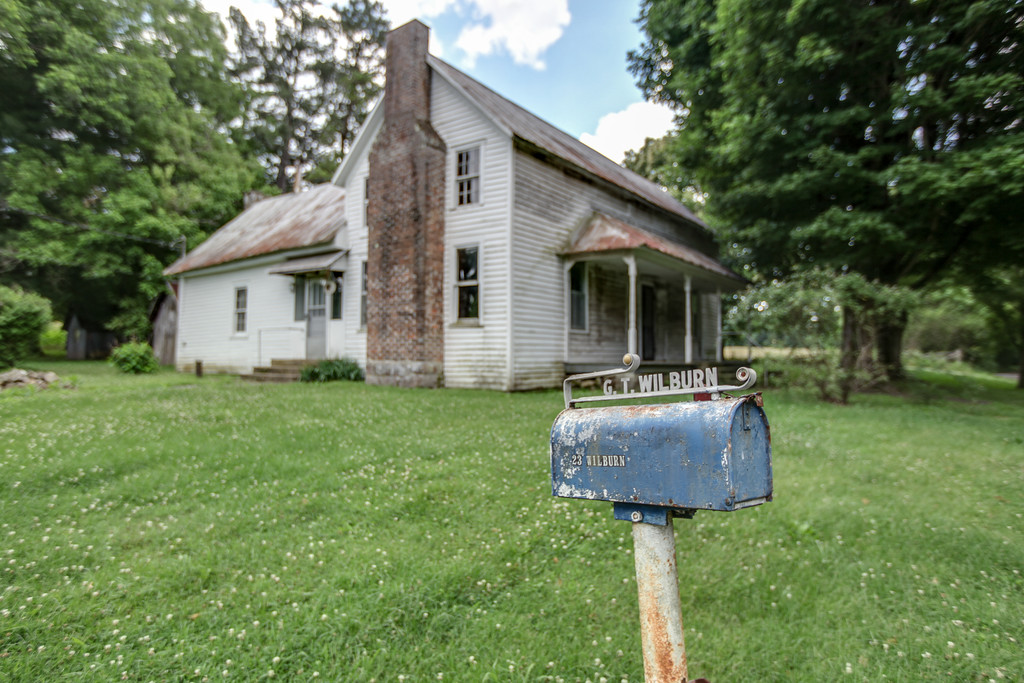
This is the historic farmhouse located at 17 Wilburn Mill Rd., Fall River, TN. This was the home of G.T. and Florence Wilburn.

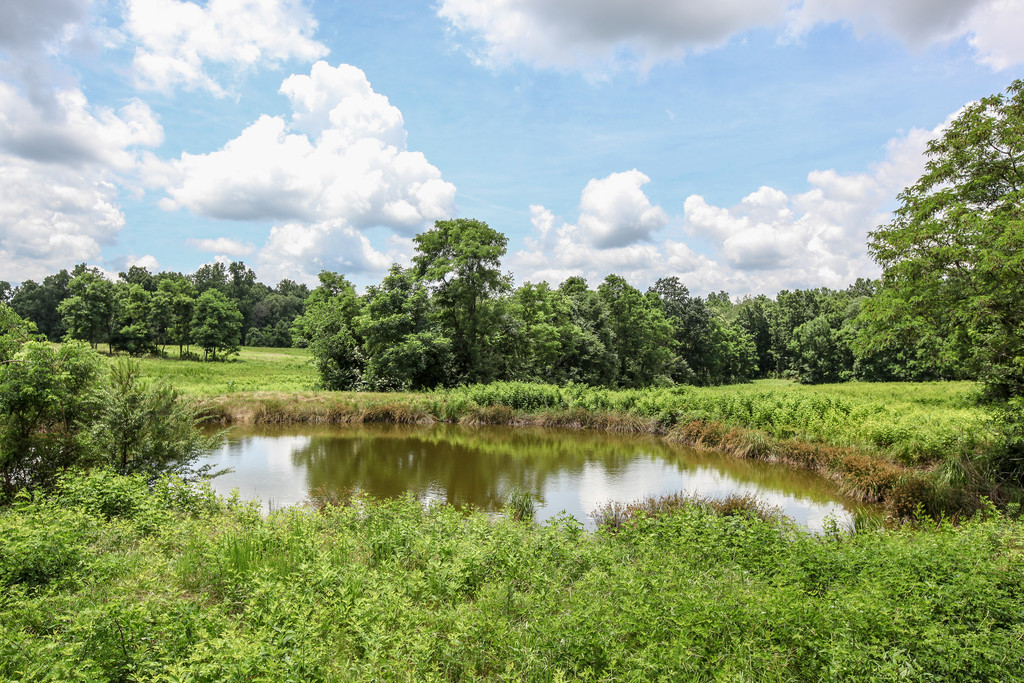
A field pond used by the cows raised at the G.T. Wilburn Grist Mill.

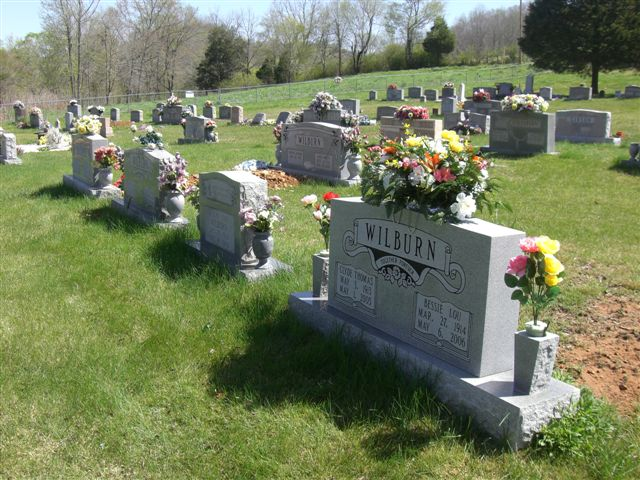
The Fall River Community Cemetery. This is a very old cemetery dating back to 1860.

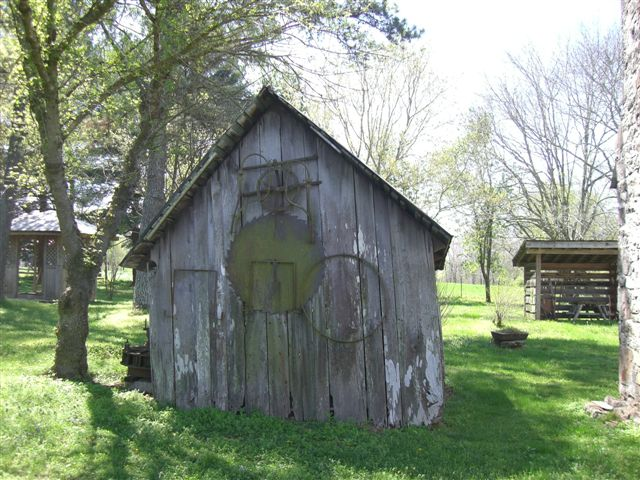
Tool and Tack Shed located at the G.T. Wilburn Grist Mill property in Fall River, Tennessee.

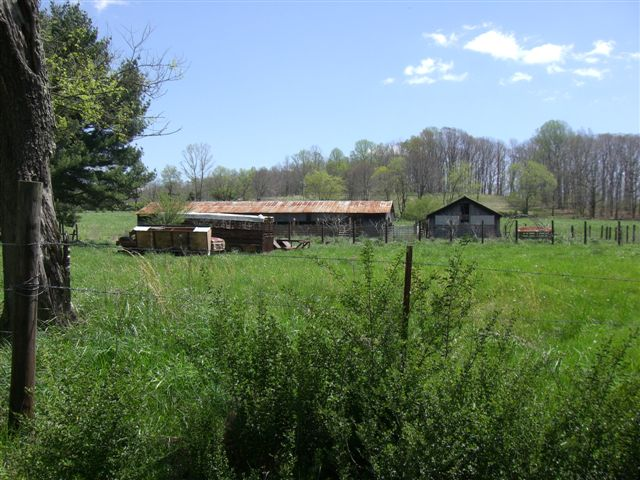
Barns located on the G.T. Wilburn Grist Mill property in Fall River, Tennessee.

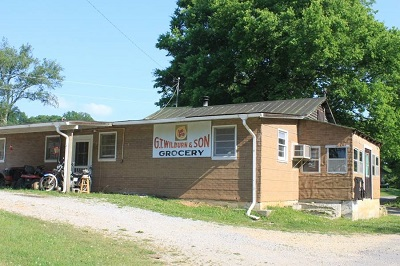
G.T. Wilburn store located across the road from the mill at Fall River, Tennessee.

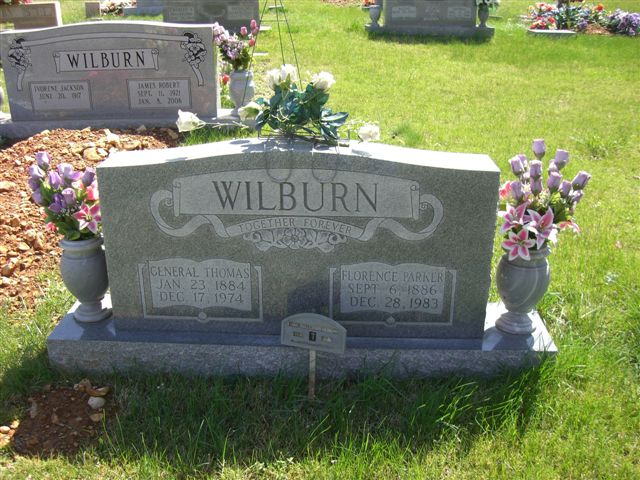
The grave of G.T. and Florence Wilburn located at the Fall River Cemetery.
