= LBJ (disambiguation) =

LBJ most commonly refers to Lyndon B. Johnson (1908–1973) the 36th President of the United States from 1963 to 1969.

LBJ may also refer to:

- LBJ: The Early Years, 1987 television movie
- LBJ (1991 film), a television documentary film
- LBJ (2016 film), film directed by Rob Reiner
- Claudia Alta "Lady Bird" Johnson (1912–2007), wife of Lyndon B. Johnson, Former First Lady of the United States
- Kampung LBJ, a settlement village in Negeri Sembilan, Malaysia
- LeBron James (born 1984), American basketball player
- Little brown job, informal name for any small brown bird
- Long Bình Jail, a U.S. Army stockade at Long Binh Post during the Vietnam War
- Long Binh Post, also known as Long Binh Junction, a U.S. Army military installation during the Vietnam War
- Komodo International Airport (IATA code: LBJ)
- "Little Brown Jug" (song), an American folk song popularized by Glenn Miller
- LBJ, a Cuban anti-imperialist satire film directed by Santiago Álvarez
- "Initials (L.B.J.)", a song from the musical Hair

== See also ==
- Facilities named after Lyndon Johnson
