= Alabama State Route 64 =

State highway in Alabama, United States

State Route 64

Route information
- Maintained by ALDOT
- Length: 18.230 mi (29.338 km)
- Existed: 1940–present

Major junctions
- West end: US 43 south of the Tennessee state line
- SR 101 in Lexington
- East end: SR 207 north of Anderson

Location
- Country: United States
- State: Alabama
- Counties: Lauderdale

Highway system
- Alabama State Highway System; Interstate; US; State
| ← SR 63 | → I-65 |

State Route 64 (SR 64) is an 18.230-mile-long (29.338 km) east–west state highway entirely within Lauderdale County in the northwest portion of the U.S. state of Alabama. The western terminus of the highway is at an intersection with U.S. Route 43 (US 43) near Green Hill, an unincorporated community south of the Tennessee state line. The eastern terminus of the highway is at an intersection with SR 207 north of Anderson.

== Route description ==
SR 64 travels along a two-lane roadway as it travels through northern Lauderdale County. The highway connects the small towns of Anderson and Lexington with US 43, which heads southward into Florence and Muscle Shoals.

The section from State Route 101 to State Route 207 was resurfaced in June 2026.

== Major intersections ==
The entire route is in Lauderdale County.

| Location | mi | km | Destinations | Notes |
|---|---|---|---|---|
| | 0.000 | 0.000 | US 43 (SR 13) – Florence, Lawrenceburg | Western terminus |
| Lexington | 10.111 | 16.272 | SR 101 – Loretto, Wheeler Dam | |
| | 18.230 | 29.338 | SR 207 – Pulaski, Minor Hill, Anderson, Rogersville | Eastern terminus |
1.000 mi = 1.609 km; 1.000 km = 0.621 mi
