= Linden City Schools =

School district in Alabama

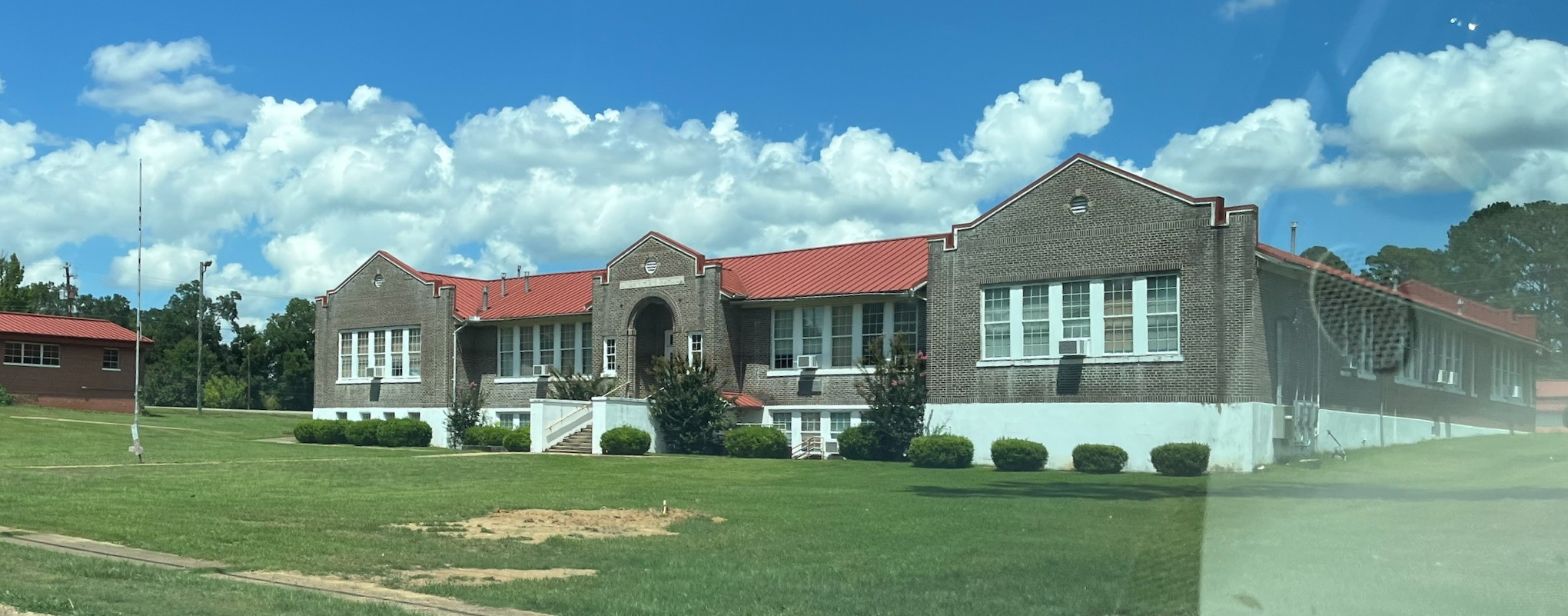
- Linden High School

Address
- 209 North Main Street Linden, Alabama, 36748; United States
- Coordinates: 32.30820°N 87.79788°W

District information
- Grades: K–12
- Superintendent: Dr. Timothy Thirman
- School board: Linden Board of Education
- Accreditation(s): Southern Association of Colleges and Schools
- NCES District ID: 0102130

Students and staff
- Students: 502 (2020-2021)
- Staff: 32.00 (on an FTE basis)
- Student–teacher ratio: 15.69

Other information
- Website: www.lindencity.org

The Linden City School District is the city school district for Linden in Marengo County, Alabama. It is the smallest school district in the state. It operates three schools, which include Linden Elementary School, George P. Austin Junior High School, and Linden High School. The system educates roughly 500 students and employs more than 80.

== Failing schools ==
Statewide testing ranks the schools in Alabama. Those in the bottom six percent are listed as "failing." As of early 2018, Linden High School was included in this category.
