= Providence, Alabama =

- Town
- Location in Marengo County, Alabama
- Coordinates: 32°20′33″N 87°46′34″W
- Country: United States
- State: Alabama
- County: Marengo

Area
  - Total: 1.75 sq mi (4.52 km^{2})
  - Land: 1.75 sq mi (4.52 km^{2})
  - Water: 0 sq mi (0.00 km^{2})
- Elevation: 98 ft (30 m)

Population (2020)
  - Total: 167
  - Density: 95.7/sq mi (36.95/km^{2})
- Time zone: UTC-6 (Central (CST))
  - Summer (DST): UTC-5 (CDT)
- FIPS code: 01-62688
- GNIS feature ID: 2407165

Providence is a town in Marengo County, Alabama, United States. As of the 2020 United States census, the population was 167, down from 223 at the 2010 census. It incorporated sometime in the 1970s.

== Geography ==
Providence is located in north-central Marengo County. It is 3 miles (5 km) north of Linden, the county seat, and 13 miles (21 km) south of Demopolis, the largest city in the county. It is bordered to the north by Chickasaw State Park.

According to the U.S. Census Bureau, the town has a total area of 1.7 square miles (4.4 km^{2}), all land. Chickasaw Bogue, a small river, passes just south of the town, flowing west to the Tombigbee River.

== Demographics ==
Historical population
| Census | Pop. | Note | %± |
|---|---|---|---|
| 1970 | 252 | | — |
| 1980 | 363 | | 44.0% |
| 1990 | 307 | | −15.4% |
| 2000 | 311 | | 1.3% |
| 2010 | 223 | | −28.3% |
| 2020 | 167 | | −25.1% |
U.S. Decennial Census; 2013 Estimate

=== Racial and ethnic composition ===
Providence town, Alabama – Racial and ethnic composition Note: the US Census treats Hispanic/Latino as an ethnic category. This table excludes Latinos from the racial categories and assigns them to a separate category. Hispanics/Latinos may be of any race.
| Race / Ethnicity (NH = Non-Hispanic) | Pop 2000 | Pop 2010 | Pop 2020 | % 2000 | % 2010 | % 2020 |
|---|---|---|---|---|---|---|
| White alone (NH) | 259 | 180 | 137 | 83.28% | 80.72% | 82.04% |
| Black or African American alone (NH) | 47 | 29 | 19 | 15.11% | 13.00% | 11.38% |
| Native American or Alaska Native alone (NH) | 0 | 0 | 0 | 0.00% | 0.00% | 0.00% |
| Asian alone (NH) | 3 | 0 | 1 | 0.96% | 0.00% | 0.60% |
| Native Hawaiian or Pacific Islander alone (NH) | 0 | 3 | 0 | 0.00% | 1.35% | 0.00% |
| Other race alone (NH) | 0 | 0 | 0 | 0.00% | 0.00% | 0.00% |
| Mixed race or Multiracial (NH) | 0 | 4 | 6 | 0.00% | 1.79% | 3.59% |
| Hispanic or Latino (any race) | 2 | 7 | 4 | 0.64% | 3.14% | 2.40% |
| Total | 311 | 223 | 167 | 100.00% | 100.00% | 100.00% |

=== 2000 census ===
As of the census of 2000, there were 311 people, 124 households, and 99 families residing in the town. The population density was 175.8 inhabitants per square mile (67.9/km^{2}). There were 133 housing units at an average density of 75.2 per square mile (29.0/km^{2}). The racial makeup of the town was 83.92% White, 15.11% Black or African American and 0.96% Asian. 0.64% of the population were Hispanic or Latino of any race.

There were 124 households, out of which 36.3% had children under the age of 18 living with them, 54.8% were married couples living together, 18.5% had a female householder with no husband present, and 19.4% were non-families. 18.5% of all households were made up of individuals, and 8.1% had someone living alone who was 65 years of age or older. The average household size was 2.51 and the average family size was 2.81.

In the town, the population was spread out, with 27.0% under the age of 18, 8.0% from 18 to 24, 24.8% from 25 to 44, 26.4% from 45 to 64, and 13.8% who were 65 years of age or older. The median age was 35 years. For every 100 females, there were 95.6 males. For every 100 females age 18 and over, there were 84.6 males.

The median income for a household in the town was $33,542, and the median income for a family was $39,375. Males had a median income of $38,750 versus $24,821 for females. The per capita income for the town was $19,382. About 6.5% of families and 10.1% of the population were below the poverty line, including 18.2% of those under age 18 and 15.3% of those age 65 or over.
