= LBJ School =

LBJ School may refer to:

- Lyndon B. Johnson School of Public Affairs, a graduate college of the University of Texas
- Lyndon B. Johnson High School (Austin, Texas), USA
- Lyndon B. Johnson High School (Johnson City, Texas), USA
- Lyndon B. Johnson High School (Laredo, Texas), USA

== See also ==
- LBJ (disambiguation)
