= Five Points, Lawrence County, Tennessee =

Five Points, Tennessee
- Unincorporated community
- Location within Tennessee Location within the United States
- Coordinates: 35°02′45″N 87°18′40″W
- Country: United States
- State: Tennessee
- County: Lawrence
- Elevation: 869 ft (265 m)
- Time zone: UTC-6 (Central (CST))
  - Summer (DST): UTC-5 (CDT)
- ZIP code: 38457
- Area code: 931
- GNIS feature ID: 1284346

Five Points is an unincorporated community in Lawrence County, Tennessee. Five Points is located along Tennessee State Route 98 7.6 miles (12.2 km) east-southeast of Loretto. Five Points has a ZIP code, 38457.

The town's longest-standing business since the 1950s was "Mashburn's General Merchandise". In 2020, the store became "Moore's Country Market".

The community had a cotton gin, saw mill, feed store, and an elementary school for grades one through eight.
