= Lexington, Alabama =

- Town
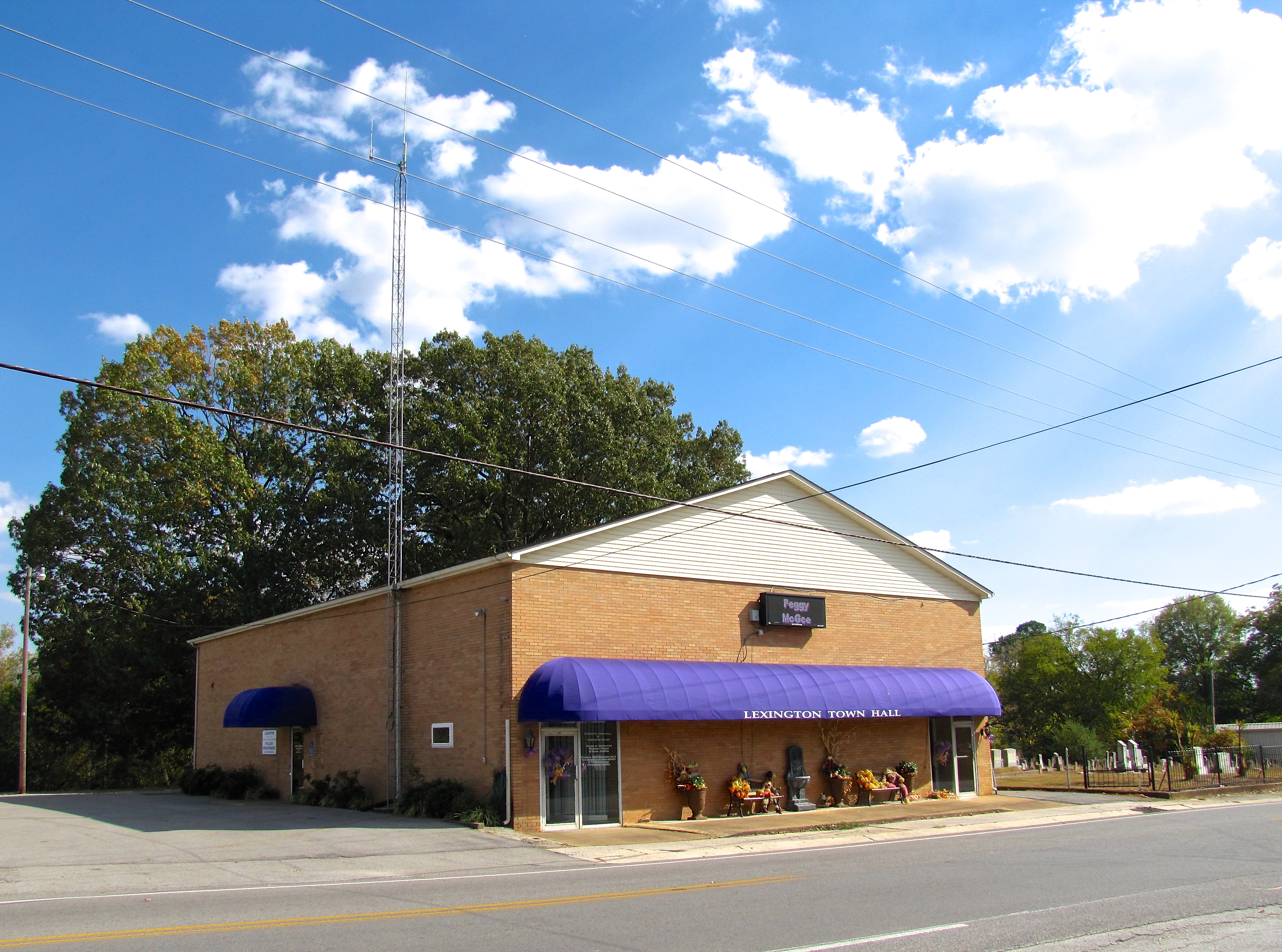
- Lexington Town Hall

- Location of Lexington in Lauderdale County, Alabama.
- Coordinates: 34°57′57″N 87°22′35″W
- Country: United States
- State: Alabama
- County: Lauderdale

Area
  - Total: 3.24 sq mi (8.39 km^{2})
  - Land: 3.24 sq mi (8.38 km^{2})
  - Water: 0.0039 sq mi (0.01 km^{2})
- Elevation: 764 ft (233 m)

Population (2020)
  - Total: 727
  - Density: 224.7/sq mi (86.75/km^{2})
- Time zone: UTC-6 (Central (CST))
  - Summer (DST): UTC-5 (CDT)
- ZIP code: 35648
- Area code: 256
- FIPS code: 01-42640
- GNIS feature ID: 2406013
- Website: lexingtonal.org

Lexington is a town in Lauderdale County, Alabama, United States. It is part of the Florence–Muscle Shoals Metropolitan Statistical Area known as "The Shoals". It incorporated in 1959. As of the 2020 census, Lexington had a population of 727.

== Geography ==
According to the U.S. Census Bureau, the town has a total area of 3.2 square miles (8.3 km^{2}), all land.

=== Major highways ===
- State Route 101
- State Route 64

=== Climate ===
Climate data for Lexington, Alabama, 1991–2020 normals, extremes 2004–present
Month	Jan	Feb	Mar	Apr	May	Jun	Jul	Aug	Sep	Oct	Nov	Dec	Year
Record high °F (°C)	78 (26)	85 (29)	87 (31)	89 (32)	92 (33)	103 (39)	102 (39)	105 (41)	97 (36)	96 (36)	86 (30)	76 (24)	105 (41)
Mean maximum °F (°C)	68.2 (20.1)	72.1 (22.3)	79.8 (26.6)	84.1 (28.9)	88.2 (31.2)	93.3 (34.1)	95.1 (35.1)	95.5 (35.3)	92.0 (33.3)	86.1 (30.1)	75.5 (24.2)	70.3 (21.3)	97.2 (36.2)
Mean daily maximum °F (°C)	50.7 (10.4)	55.0 (12.8)	63.9 (17.7)	73.0 (22.8)	79.5 (26.4)	87.0 (30.6)	90.2 (32.3)	89.9 (32.2)	84.3 (29.1)	73.8 (23.2)	61.9 (16.6)	53.3 (11.8)	71.9 (22.2)
Daily mean °F (°C)	40.8 (4.9)	44.6 (7.0)	52.6 (11.4)	61.0 (16.1)	68.7 (20.4)	76.5 (24.7)	79.4 (26.3)	78.9 (26.1)	73.0 (22.8)	61.7 (16.5)	50.9 (10.5)	44.0 (6.7)	61.0 (16.1)
Mean daily minimum °F (°C)	30.9 (−0.6)	34.1 (1.2)	41.3 (5.2)	49.1 (9.5)	57.9 (14.4)	66.0 (18.9)	68.7 (20.4)	67.9 (19.9)	61.7 (16.5)	49.5 (9.7)	40.0 (4.4)	34.7 (1.5)	50.2 (10.1)
Mean minimum °F (°C)	10.7 (−11.8)	16.6 (−8.6)	22.9 (−5.1)	31.5 (−0.3)	43.0 (6.1)	55.3 (12.9)	60.3 (15.7)	58.6 (14.8)	47.3 (8.5)	32.0 (0.0)	21.4 (−5.9)	17.4 (−8.1)	9.0 (−12.8)
Record low °F (°C)	1 (−17)	5 (−15)	13 (−11)	22 (−6)	36 (2)	48 (9)	55 (13)	50 (10)	42 (6)	26 (−3)	14 (−10)	−1 (−18)	−1 (−18)
Average precipitation inches (mm)	6.04 (153)	5.47 (139)	5.53 (140)	5.30 (135)	5.48 (139)	4.61 (117)	3.92 (100)	3.97 (101)	4.49 (114)	3.57 (91)	4.19 (106)	5.97 (152)	58.54 (1,487)
Average precipitation days (≥ 0.01 in)	10.9	11.8	11.1	10.1	10.7	10.7	9.9	9.5	7.3	8.7	9.7	10.4	120.8
Source 1: NOAA
Source 2: National Weather Service (mean maxima/minima 2006–2020)

== Demographics ==
Historical population
Census	Pop.	Note	%±
1880	72		—
1960	315		—
1970	278		−11.7%
1980	884		218.0%
1990	821		−7.1%
2000	840		2.3%
2010	735		−12.5%
2020	727		−1.1%
U.S. Decennial Census; 2013 Estimate

=== 2020 census ===
Lexington racial composition
Race	Num.	Perc.
White (non-Hispanic)	688	94.64%
Native American	4	0.55%
Other/Mixed	17	2.34%
Hispanic or Latino	18	2.48%

As of the 2020 United States census, there were 727 people, 366 households, and 261 families residing in the town.

=== 2000 census ===
As of the census of 2000, there were 840 people, 364 households, and 244 families residing in the town. The population density was 261.5 inhabitants per square mile (101.0/km^{2}). There were 394 housing units at an average density of 122.6 per square mile (47.3/km^{2}). The racial makeup of the town was 99.29% White, 0.24% Native American, and 0.48% from two or more races. 0.36% of the population were Hispanic or Latino of any race.

There were 364 households, out of which 27.5% had children under the age of 18 living with them, 55.2% were married couples living together, 8.2% had a female householder with no husband present, and 32.7% were non-families. 30.5% of all households were made up of individuals, and 18.1% had someone living alone who was 65 years of age or older. The average household size was 2.31 and the average family size was 2.86.

In the town, the population was spread out, with 21.8% under the age of 18, 7.6% from 18 to 24, 27.9% from 25 to 44, 23.8% from 45 to 64, and 18.9% who were 65 years of age or older. The median age was 40 years. For every 100 females, there were 85.0 males. For every 100 females age 18 and over, there were 87.7 males.

The median income for a household in the town was $31,736, and the median income for a family was $38,500. Males had a median income of $35,083 versus $17,422 for females. The per capita income for the town was $15,184. About 5.9% of families and 9.8% of the population were below the poverty line, including 5.5% of those under age 18 and 18.7% of those age 65 or over.

== Education ==
Lexington School is a K–12 public school in Lexington serving about 300 students. A rural school, its test scores have been above the district and state average. The student body is predominantly White.

== Notable people ==
- Don Leslie Michael, posthumous Medal of Honor recipient for his actions in the Vietnam War
- Frank Nunley, former linebacker for the San Francisco 49ers
