= Leoma, Tennessee =

- Census-designated place
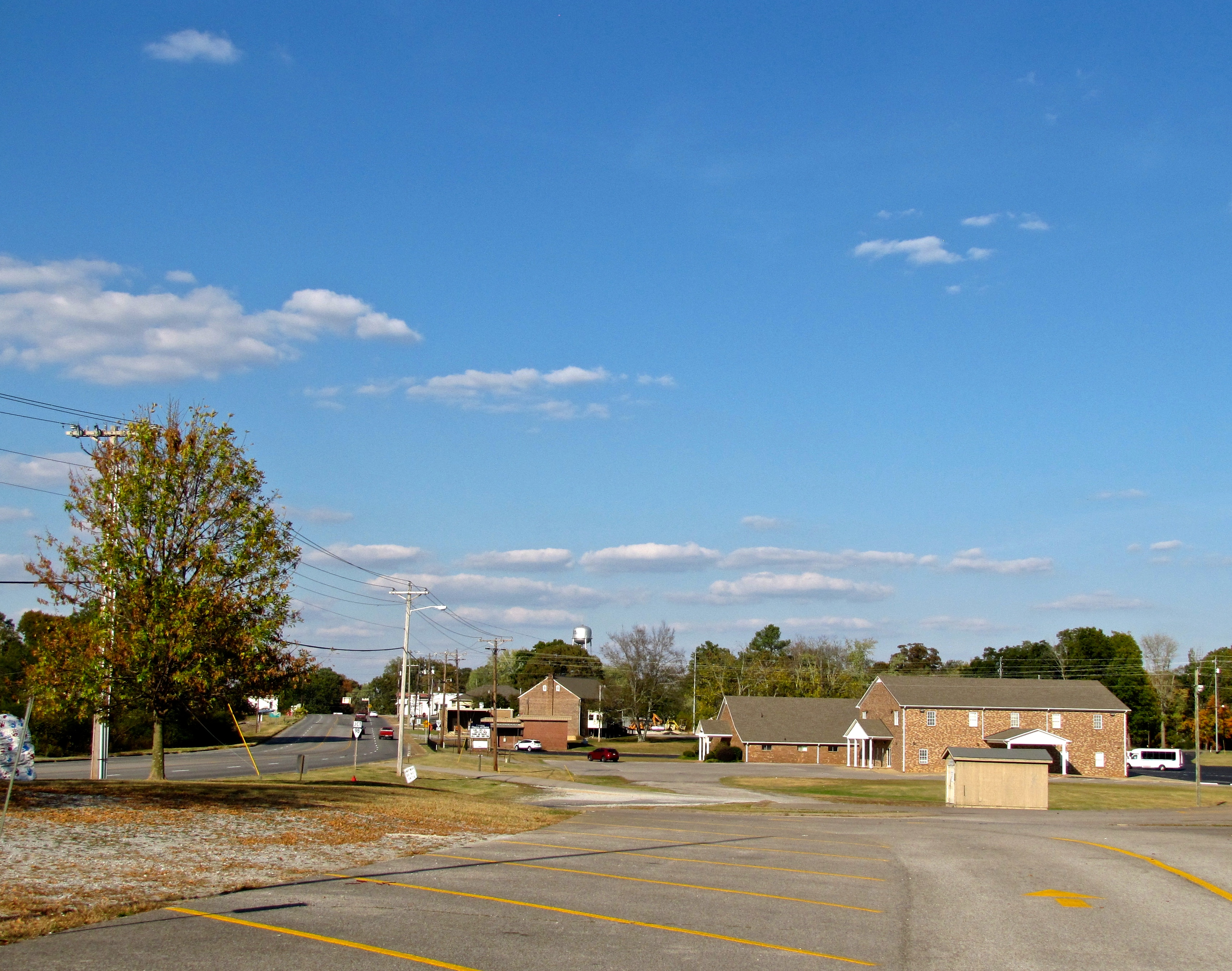
- Leoma

- Location within Tennessee Location within the United States
- Coordinates: 35°09′41″N 87°20′53″W
- Country: United States
- State: Tennessee
- County: Lawrence

Area
  - Total: 1.90 sq mi (4.91 km^{2})
  - Land: 1.90 sq mi (4.91 km^{2})
  - Water: 0 sq mi (0.00 km^{2})
- Elevation: 958 ft (292 m)

Population (2020)
  - Total: 464
  - Density: 244.6/sq mi (94.43/km^{2})
- Time zone: Central (CST)
  - Summer (DST): CDT
- ZIP code: 38468
- Area code: 931
- GNIS feature ID: 1291024

Leoma is an unincorporated community and census-designated place (CDP) located in Lawrence County, Tennessee, United States. It is situated along U.S. Route 43 between Loretto and Lawrenceburg.

The G.T. Wilburn Grist Mill is in Leoma. The community is also home to Leoma Elementary School, the Lawrence County Archives, Hope Botanical Garden, and a post office (zip code 38468).

The 2020 population of the CDP was 464.

== Demographics ==
Historical population
Census	Pop.	Note	%±
2020	464		—
U.S. Decennial Census
