= Dodge City, Alabama =

- Town
- Location of Dodge City in Cullman County, Alabama.
- Coordinates: 34°02′58″N 86°52′38″W
- Country: United States
- State: Alabama
- County: Cullman

Government
  - Mayor: Jason Burney

Area
  - Total: 3.53 sq mi (9.13 km^{2})
  - Land: 3.51 sq mi (9.10 km^{2})
  - Water: 0.012 sq mi (0.03 km^{2})
- Elevation: 637 ft (194 m)

Population (2020)
  - Total: 548
  - Density: 155.9/sq mi (60.21/km^{2})
- Time zone: UTC-6 (Central (CST))
  - Summer (DST): UTC-5 (CDT)
- FIPS code: 01-20955
- GNIS feature ID: 2406384
- Website: dodgecitytown.com

Dodge City is a town in Cullman County, Alabama, United States. At the 2020 census, the population was 548. It was incorporated in 1993.

== Geography ==
Dodge City is located south of the center of Cullman County.

According to the U.S. Census Bureau, the town has a total area of 3.4 square miles (8.9 km^{2}), of which 0.012 square miles (0.03 km^{2}), or 0.30%, is water.

== Demographics ==
Historical population
Census	Pop.	Note	%±
2000	612		—
2010	593		−3.1%
2020	548		−7.6%
U.S. Decennial Census

=== 2020 census ===
Dodge City racial composition
Race	Num.	Perc.
White (non-Hispanic)	518	94.53%
Black or African American (non-Hispanic)	1	0.18%
Native American	3	0.55%
Other/Mixed	15	2.74%
Hispanic or Latino	11	2.01%

As of the 2020 United States census, there were 548 people, 251 households, and 174 families residing in the town.

=== 2000 census ===
As of the census of 2000, there were 612 people, 231 households, and 184 families residing in the town. The population density was 194.7 inhabitants per square mile (75.2/km^{2}). There were 253 housing units at an average density of 80.5 per square mile (31.1/km^{2}). The racial makeup of the town was 99.51% White, and 0.49% from two or more races. 0.33% of the population were Hispanic or Latino of any race.

There were 231 households, out of which 33.3% had children under the age of 18 living with them, 70.1% were married couples living together, 6.9% had a female householder with no husband present, and 20.3% were non-families. 17.7% of all households were made up of individuals, and 6.9% had someone living alone who was 65 years of age or older. The average household size was 2.65 and the average family size was 2.99.

In the town, the population was spread out, with 25.7% under the age of 18, 8.0% from 18 to 24, 28.9% from 25 to 44, 25.7% from 45 to 64, and 11.8% who were 65 years of age or older. The median age was 37 years. For every 100 females, there were 106.8 males. For every 100 females age 18 and over, there were 101.3 males.

The median income for a household in the town was $30,417, and the median income for a family was $33,393. Males had a median income of $29,028 versus $18,214 for females. The per capita income for the town was $14,111. About 6.9% of families and 8.2% of the population were below the poverty line, including 6.8% of those under age 18 and 21.4% of those age 65 or over.
