= Zip City, Alabama =

Unincorporated community in Alabama, United States

- Unincorporated community
- Location within Alabama Location within the United States
- Coordinates: 34°57′17″N 87°40′12″W
- Country: United States
- State: Alabama
- County: Lauderdale
- Elevation: 728 ft (222 m)
- Time zone: UTC-6 (CST)
  - Summer (DST): UTC-5 (CDT)
- ZIP: 35633
- Area codes: 256 and 938
- GNIS feature ID: 129364

Zip City is a small unincorporated community in Lauderdale County in the northern part of the U.S. state of Alabama, at the intersection of Alabama Highway 17 and County Road 8. Zip City falls within the U.S. Central Time Zone. It is part of the Florence – Muscle Shoals Metropolitan Statistical Area known as "The Shoals".

== History ==
The first non-indigenous settlement was made at Zip City in 1817. Zip City received its unusual name from the fact drivers would "zip" through town heading towards the Tennessee state line, where they could buy alcohol. The name dates from the 1920s.

== In popular culture ==
Zip City was popularized by the Drive-By Truckers song of the same name. The song was penned by the Truckers' co-founder, Mike Cooley, (a longtime resident of the area) in 2001. The song appeared on the Truckers' 2001 release, Southern Rock Opera.
