= Fulton, Alabama =

- Town
- Location of Fulton in Clarke County, Alabama.
- Coordinates: 31°47′41″N 87°44′58″W
- Country: United States
- State: Alabama
- County: Clarke

Area
  - Total: 2.45 sq mi (6.35 km^{2})
  - Land: 2.45 sq mi (6.35 km^{2})
  - Water: 0 sq mi (0.00 km^{2})
- Elevation: 266 ft (81 m)

Population (2020)
  - Total: 223
  - Density: 91.0/sq mi (35.13/km^{2})
- Time zone: UTC-6 (Central (CST))
  - Summer (DST): UTC-5 (CDT)
- ZIP code: 36446
- Area code: 334
- FIPS code: 01-28504
- GNIS feature ID: 2406530

Fulton is a town in Clarke County, Alabama, United States. At the 2020 census, the population was 223.

== History ==
Fulton was first settled in the 1880s as a stop on the Mobile and Birmingham Railroad and was originally known as Wade's Station. In 1888 the Virgin Pine Lumber Company was founded in the area and the community's name was changed to Behrman. The name was eventually changed to Fulton. The town was once home to a school.

== Geography ==
According to the U.S. Census Bureau, the town has a total area of 2.5 square miles (6.5 km^{2}), all land.

== Demographics ==
Historical population
Census	Pop.	Note	%±
1900	140		—
1910	518		270.0%
1920	709		36.9%
1930	766		8.0%
1940	707		−7.7%
1950	696		−1.6%
1960	688		−1.1%
1970	628		−8.7%
1980	606		−3.5%
1990	384		−36.6%
2000	308		−19.8%
2010	272		−11.7%
2020	223		−18.0%
U.S. Decennial Census; 2013 Estimate

At the 2000 census there were 308 people, 122 households, and 87 families in the town. The population density was 123.6 inhabitants per square mile (47.7/km^{2}). There were 139 housing units at an average density of 55.8 per square mile (21.5/km^{2}). The racial makeup of the town was 82.14% White and 17.86% Black or African American. Of the 122 households 38.5% had children under the age of 18 living with them, 59.0% were married couples living together, 9.8% had a female householder with no husband present, and 27.9% were non-families. 27.0% of households were one person and 18.0% were one person aged 65 or older. The average household size was 2.52 and the average family size was 3.07.

The age distribution was 28.2% under the age of 18, 8.8% from 18 to 24, 27.6% from 25 to 44, 18.8% from 45 to 64, and 16.6% 65 or older. The median age was 34 years. For every 100 females, there were 91.3 males. For every 100 females age 18 and over, there were 84.2 males.

The median household income was $23,750 and the median family income was $33,500. Males had a median income of $29,107 versus $15,417 for females. The per capita income for the town was $12,602. About 11.8% of families and 17.8% of the population were below the poverty line, including 22.9% of those under the age of eighteen and 16.7% of those sixty five or over.

== Notable person ==
- Grey Clarke, former Major League Baseball player
