= Linden, Alabama =

City in Alabama, United States

- City
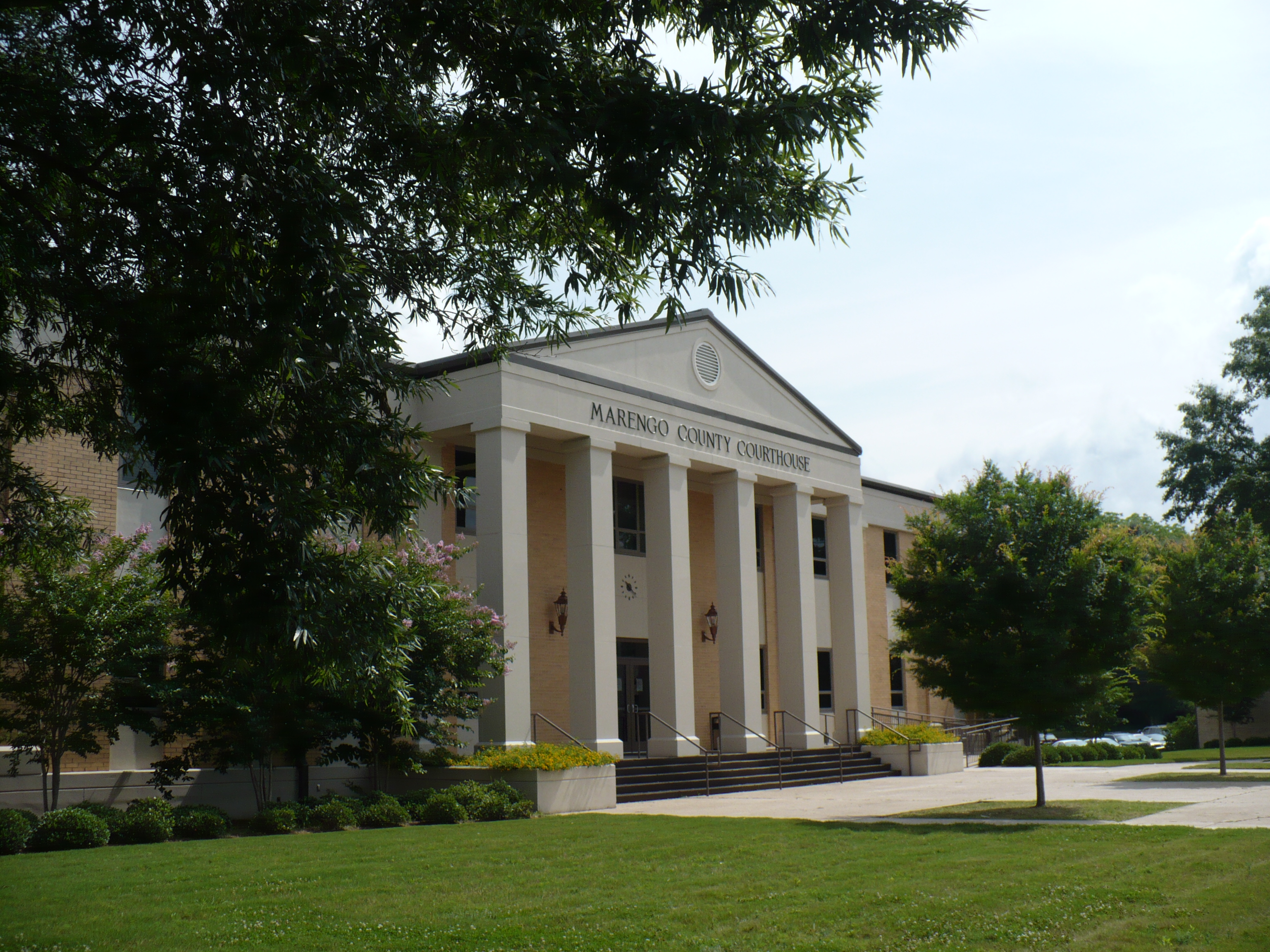
- Marengo County Courthouse in Linden

- Seal

- Location in Marengo County, Alabama
- Coordinates: 32°18′00″N 87°47′33″W
- Country: United States
- State: Alabama
- County: Marengo

Government
  - Type: Mayor/Council

Area
  - Total: 3.61 sq mi (9.36 km^{2})
  - Land: 3.58 sq mi (9.27 km^{2})
  - Water: 0.035 sq mi (0.09 km^{2})
- Elevation: 151 ft (46 m)

Population (2020)
  - Total: 1,930
  - Density: 539.3/sq mi (208.24/km^{2})
- Time zone: UTC-6 (Central (CST))
  - Summer (DST): UTC-5 (CDT)
- ZIP code: 36748
- Area code: 334
- FIPS code: 01-43240
- GNIS feature ID: 2404934
- Website: www.lindenalabama.net

Linden is a city in and the county seat of Marengo County, Alabama, United States. The population was 1,930 at the 2020 census, down from 2,123 at the 2010 census.

== History ==
Settled prior to 1818, the community was first known as "Screamersville", since the cry of wild animals could still be heard during the night. It became the county seat in 1819 and was then known as the "Town of Marengo". This was changed to "Hohenlinden" in 1823, to honor the county's earliest European settlers, French Bonapartist refugees to the Vine and Olive Colony. The name commemorated the battle in 1800 at Hohenlinden, Bavaria, where the French defeated the armies of both Austria and Bavaria. The spelling was later shortened to just "Linden."

== Geography ==
Linden is located in central Marengo County. It is 16 miles (26 km) south of Demopolis, the largest city in Marengo County, 11 miles (18 km) west of Thomaston, and 28 miles (45 km) north of Thomasville.

According to the U.S. Census Bureau, the city has a total area of 3.6 square miles (9.3 km^{2}), of which 0.03 square miles (0.08 km^{2}), or 0.94%, are water. The city drains north to Chickasaw Bogue, a west-flowing tributary of the Tombigbee River, and south to Sycamore Creek, a tributary of Chickasaw Bogue.

== Demographics ==
Historical population
Census	Pop.	Note	%±
1860	171		—
1870	300		75.4%
1910	600		—
1920	700		16.7%
1930	982		40.3%
1940	1,203		22.5%
1950	1,363		13.3%
1960	2,516		84.6%
1970	2,697		7.2%
1980	2,773		2.8%
1990	2,548		−8.1%
2000	2,424		−4.9%
2010	2,123		−12.4%
2020	1,930		−9.1%
U.S. Decennial Census; 2013 Estimate

=== 2020 census ===
As of the 2020 census, Linden had a population of 1,930 and 827 households, including 349 families. The median age was 44.1 years. 20.2% of residents were under the age of 18 and 21.5% of residents were 65 years of age or older. For every 100 females there were 90.9 males, and for every 100 females age 18 and over there were 87.1 males age 18 and over.

0.0% of residents lived in urban areas, while 100.0% lived in rural areas.

Of the 827 households, 28.9% had children under the age of 18 living with them. Of all households, 32.6% were married-couple households, 21.4% were households with a male householder and no spouse or partner present, and 40.5% were households with a female householder and no spouse or partner present. About 35.7% of all households were made up of individuals and 14.5% had someone living alone who was 65 years of age or older.

There were 981 housing units, of which 15.7% were vacant. The homeowner vacancy rate was 2.3% and the rental vacancy rate was 10.0%.

Racial composition as of the 2020 census
Race	Number	Percent
White	838	43.4%
Black or African American	1,036	53.7%
American Indian and Alaska Native	0	0.0%
Asian	1	0.1%
Native Hawaiian and Other Pacific Islander	0	0.0%
Some other race	18	0.9%
Two or more races	37	1.9%
Hispanic or Latino (of any race)	17	0.9%

=== 2010 census ===
At the 2010 census, there were 2,123 people, 877 households, and 555 families living in the city. The population density was 589.7 inhabitants per square mile (227.7/km^{2}). There were 1,013 housing units at an average density of 281.4 per square mile (108.6/km^{2}). The racial makeup of the city was 51.1% White, 46.7% Black or African American, 0.1% Native American, 0.2% Asian, and 0.9% from two or more races. 2.0% of the population were Hispanic or Latino of any race.

Of the 877 households 23.4% had children under the age of 18 living with them, 37.7% were married couples living together, 21.1% had a female householder with no husband present, and 36.7% were non-families. 34.3% of households were one person and 14.7% were one person aged 65 or older. The average household size was 2.25 and the average family size was 2.88.

The age distribution was 20.8% under the age of 18, 10.1% from 18 to 24, 21.2% from 25 to 44, 25.1% from 45 to 64, and 22.8% 65 or older. The median age was 42.6 years. For every 100 females, there were 85.1 males. For every 100 females age 18 and over, there were 92.0 males.

The median household income was $20,145 and the median family income was $35,714. Males had a median income of $30,833 versus $25,000 for females. The per capita income for the city was $14,701. About 31.1% of families and 31.8% of the population were below the poverty line, including 41.1% of those under age 18 and 8.7% of those age 65 or over.

=== 2000 census ===
At the 2000 census, there were 2,424 people, 938 households, and 662 families living in the city. The population density was 675.6 inhabitants per square mile (260.9/km^{2}). There were 1,084 housing units at an average density of 302.1 per square mile (116.6/km^{2}). The racial makeup of the city was 52.43% White, 46.20% Black or African American, 0.17% Native American, 0.33% Asian, and 0.87% from two or more races. 1.07% of the population were Hispanic or Latino of any race.

Of the 938 households 33.0% had children under the age of 18 living with them, 45.1% were married couples living together, 22.1% had a female householder with no husband present, and 29.4% were non-families. 27.8% of households were one person and 14.4% were one person aged 65 or older. The average household size was 2.48 and the average family size was 2.98.

The age distribution was 27.7% under the age of 18, 8.0% from 18 to 24, 23.8% from 25 to 44, 20.9% from 45 to 64, and 19.5% 65 or older. The median age was 38 years. For every 100 females, there were 81.4 males. For every 100 females age 18 and over, there were 74.3 males.

The median household income was $22,303 and the median family income was $30,733. Males had a median income of $38,964 versus $17,857 for females. The per capita income for the city was $16,536. About 23.8% of families and 29.6% of the population were below the poverty line, including 46.8% of those under age 18 and 19.0% of those age 65 or over.

== Transportation ==
- U.S. Highway 43
- State Route 28
- State Route 69

Linden is accessed by way of one U.S. Highway: US 43 which runs north–south through the city as Main Street connecting the city to Demopolis to the north and Thomasville to the south. SR 28 runs east–west through the city as Coats Avenue connecting the city to US 80 to the northwest and the towns of Thomaston and Camden to the southeast. SR 69 runs north–south through the city cosigned with US 43 before leaving US 43 at the far south end of town heading southwest towards Myrtlewood and connecting to Butler by way of SR 10.

In her 2021 State of the State address, Governor Kay Ivey confirmed that her administration would be moving forward with a long proposed plan to expand US 43 to four lanes from "Thomasville to Tuscaloosa." Upon completion, the expansion to US 43 will most likely pass around Linden by way of a bypass.

== Media ==
The Linden Leader, a weekly newspaper, is based in Linden.

== Education ==
The city runs its own citywide school system, Linden City Schools. It also had one private school, Marengo Academy, founded in 1969; one of many segregation academies as they are known, which cropped up in the South after segregation was made illegal. Marengo Academy closed in 2019.

== Notable people ==
- Ralph Abernathy, civil rights leader
- William J. Alston, United States Representative to the Thirty-first Congress
- Frank Evans, professional baseball player in the Negro leagues
- Autherine Lucy Foster, civil rights trailblazer; first African-American student at the University of Alabama
- Sean Richardson, safety for the Green Bay Packers
- Roy Rogers, professional basketball player and coach
