= Coffeeville, Alabama =

- Town
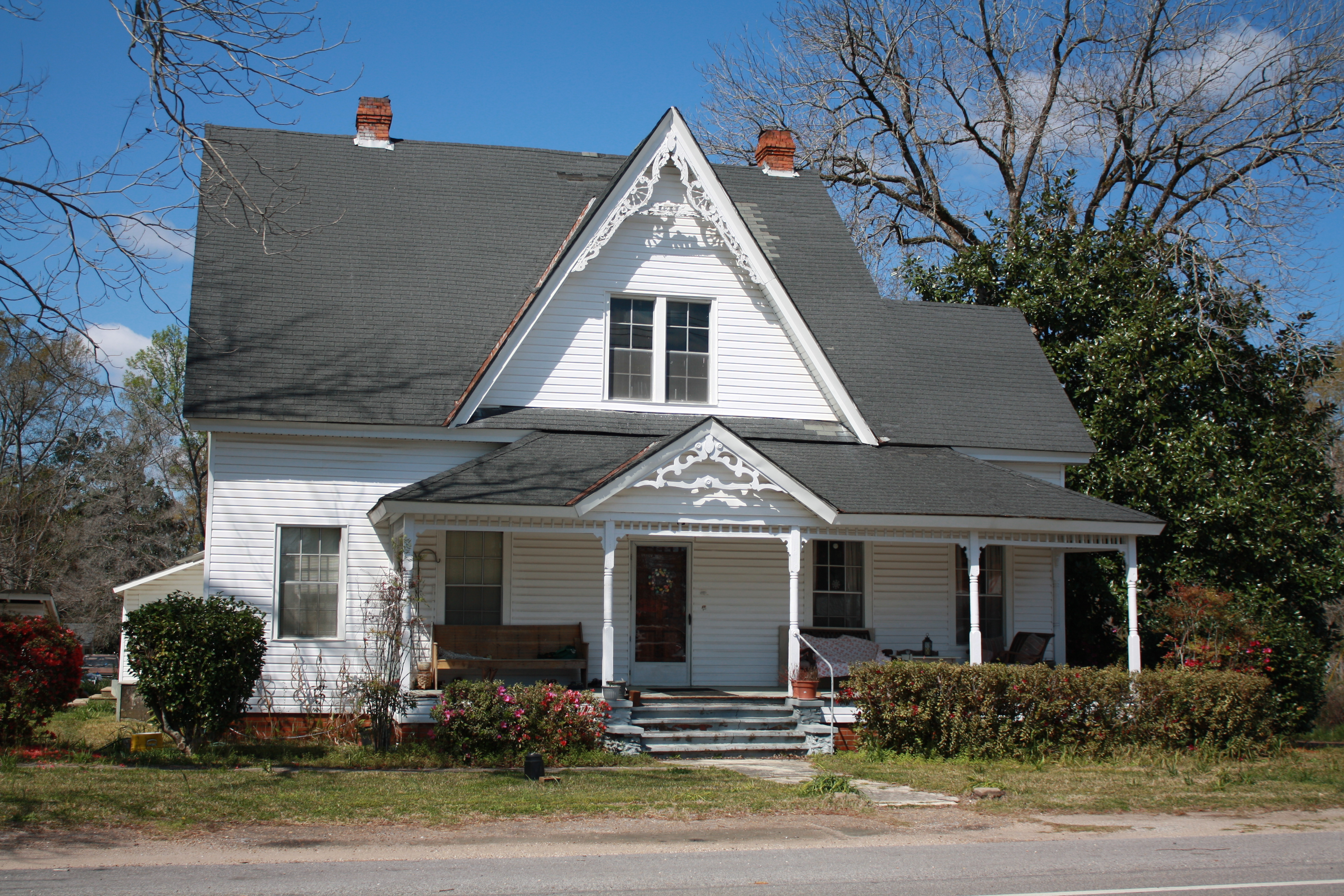
- Victorian house on Alabama State Route 69 in Coffeeville

- Location of Coffeeville in Clarke County, Alabama.
- Coordinates: 31°45′29″N 88°05′03″W
- Country: United States
- State: Alabama
- County: Clarke

Area
  - Total: 4.52 sq mi (11.71 km^{2})
  - Land: 4.52 sq mi (11.71 km^{2})
  - Water: 0 sq mi (0.00 km^{2})
- Elevation: 180 ft (55 m)

Population (2020)
  - Total: 263
  - Density: 58.2/sq mi (22.47/km^{2})
- Time zone: UTC-6 (Central (CST))
  - Summer (DST): UTC-5 (CDT)
- ZIP code: 36524
- Area code: 251
- FIPS code: 01-16264
- GNIS feature ID: 2406289
- Website: https://www.townofcoffeeville.org/

Coffeeville is a town in Clarke County, Alabama, United States. At the 2020 census, the population was 263.

== History ==
The town of Coffeeville was incorporated in 1817, and named after General John Coffee.

In 1892, Coffeeville was the site for a violent confrontation around economic and racial divides that later became known as the Mitcham War.

In 1939, racial violence in Coffeeville was brought to the attention of President Franklin D. Roosevelt following a near-lynching incident involving the complicity of the mayor of Coffeeville.

== Geography ==
Coffeeville is located in northwestern Clarke County, on high ground on the east side of the Tombigbee River.

According to the U.S. Census Bureau, the town has a total area of 4.5 square miles (11.7 km^{2}), all land.

== Demographics ==
Historical population
Census	Pop.	Note	%±
1870	280		—
1880	104		−62.9%
1940	250		—
1950	211		−15.6%
1960	250		18.5%
1970	441		76.4%
1980	448		1.6%
1990	431		−3.8%
2000	360		−16.5%
2010	352		−2.2%
2020	263		−25.3%
U.S. Decennial Census; 2013 Estimate

As of the census of 2000, there were 360 people, 165 households, and 97 families residing in the town. The population density was 79.7 inhabitants per square mile (30.8/km^{2}). There were 209 housing units at an average density of 46.3 per square mile (17.9/km^{2}). The racial makeup of the town was 61.11% White and 38.89% Black or African American.

There were 165 households, out of which 22.4% had children under the age of 18 living with them, 40.6% were married couples living together, 13.9% had a female householder with no husband present, and 41.2% were non-families. 40.6% of all households were made up of individuals, and 21.2% had someone living alone who was 65 years of age or older. The average household size was 2.18 and the average family size was 2.95.

In the town, the population was spread out, with 23.9% under the age of 18, 6.9% from 18 to 24, 23.1% from 25 to 44, 25.3% from 45 to 64, and 20.8% who were 65 years of age or older. The median age was 42 years. For every 100 females, there were 80.9 males. For every 100 females age 18 and over, there were 80.3 males.

The median income for a household in the town was $19,545, and the median income for a family was $33,125. Males had a median income of $29,000 versus $17,500 for females. The per capita income for the town was $16,886. About 18.8% of families and 25.6% of the population were below the poverty line, including 42.2% of those under age 18 and 19.7% of those age 65 or over.

== Notable people ==
- Tom Long, professional baseball outfielder
- Ashton Shepherd, singer
- Willie J. Slater, head football coach for the Tuskegee University Golden Tigers
