= List of Alabama placenames of Native American origin =

Many places throughout Alabama take their names from the languages of the indigenous Native American/American Indian tribes. The following list includes settlements, geographic features, and political subdivisions whose names are derived from these indigenous languages. The primary Native American peoples present in Alabama during historical times included the Alibamu, Cherokee, Chickasaw, Choctaw, Koasati, and the lower and upper Muscogee (Creeks).

With the exception of the Cherokee, all of the historical Alabama tribes speak Muskogean languages. There are competing classification systems, but the traditionally accepted usage divides the dialects into Eastern Muskogean (Alibamu, Koasatia, and Muscogee) and Western Muskogean (Chickasaw and Choctaw). The Cherokee language belongs to the separate Iroquoian language family.

== Listings ==
=== State ===
- Alabama – named for the Alibamu, a tribe whose name derives from a Choctaw phrase meaning "thicket-clearers" or "plant-cutters" (from albah, "(medicinal) plants", and amo, "to clear").
  - Alabama River

=== Counties ===
- Autauga County – from the Alibamu phrase atagi, meaning "pure water".
- Cherokee County – named after the Cherokee people.
  - Shared with the town of Cherokee.
- Choctaw County – named after the Choctaw people.
- Conecuh County – from the Muscogee phrase koha anaka, meaning "near Canebrake".
  - Shared with the Conecuh River.
- Coosa County – from the Choctaw phrase koshak, meaning "cane".
  - Shared with the Coosa River.
- Escambia County – from the Choctaw phrase oski ambeha, meaning "the cane therein".
- Etowah County – likely from an extinct Cherokee settlement named Etiwaw.
- Mobile County – named after a Native American tribe, perhaps from Choctaw moeli, meaning "to row" or "to paddle".
  - Shared with the city of Mobile, the Mobile Bay and the Mobile River.
- Talladega County – derived from the Muscogee phrase italua atigi, meaning "town on the border".
  - Shared with the cities of Talladega and Talladega Springs.
- Tallapoosa County – from the Choctaw words tali (rock) and pushi (pulverized).
  - Shared with the Tallapoosa River.
- Tuscaloosa County – derived from Muskogean words tashka (warrior) and lusa (black). Chief Tuskaloosa is remembered for leading a battle against Spanish conquistador Hernando de Soto in southern Alabama in 1540.
  - Shared with the city of Tuscaloosa.

=== Settlements ===
- Arbacoochee – from the Muskogean phrase abihkuchi, meaning "a pile at the base".
- Attalla – from the Cherokee word otali, meaning "mountain".
- Bashi – from the Choctaw phrase bachaya, meaning "line" or "row".
- Bogue Chitto – from the Choctaw phrase book chito, meaning "big creek".
- Boligee – from the Choctaw phrase boolitusha, meaning "to strike and cut into pieces".
- Cahaba – from the Choctaw phrase oka-uba, meaning "water from above".
  - Shared with the Cahaba River.
- Chewacla – from the Hitchiti phrase sawackla, meaning "raccoon village".
  - Shared with Chewacla State Park.
- Chickasaw - named for the Chickasaw tribe.
- Coosada - named for the Coushatta tribe.
- Cusseta - a Muscogee tribal town.
- Eastaboga, Alabama - from Muscogee este (person), ak (in water, a low place), pokv (from the work vpoketv: to sit/live).
- Escatawpa – from the Choctaw phrase eskatawpa, meaning "the place where cane is cut".
  - Shared with the Escatawpa River.
- Eufaula - from the Muscogee yofalv, the name of a tribal town.
- Eutaw - possibly from the Cherokee Etiwaw and its earlier form iitaawaa (long leafed pine tree).
- Kahatchie - from the Muscogee koha hachi (cane creek).
- Letohatchee - from the Muscogee li ito fachita (those who make arrows straight).
- Loachapoka - from the Muscogee loca poga (where the turtles live/sit) (from the words Loca and vpoketv) .
- Lubbub and Lubbub Creek - from the Choctaw word lahba, which means "warm".
- Nanafalia - from the Choctaw words nanih (hill) and falaiya (long).
- Notasulga - from the Muscogee noti sulgi (many teeth).
- Oakmulgee - from the Hitchiti word ockmulgee, which means "bubbling water," with oki meaning "water" and mulgi meaning "boiling".
- Ohatchee - possibly from the Muscogee oh hacci (upper stream).
- Oneonta - possibly from the Iroquoian oneyota (protruding stone).
- Opelika - from the Muscogee opilwa lako (big swamp).
- Panola - from Choctaw word ponola or ponoola (cotton).
- Pintlala from the Muscogee phrase pithlohalata, meaning "dragging a canoe".
  - Shared with the nearby Pintlala Creek.
- Sylacauga - from the Muscogee words sule (buzzard) and kake (sitting).
- Talladega, Talladega County, and Talladega Springs - talladega is derived from the Muscogee words italua (town), and atigi (at the end, on the border).
- Tallahatta Springs - adaptation of Choctaw words, tali (rock) and hata (silver, white).
- Tallapoosa County and Tallapoosa River - from the Choctaw words tali (rock) and pushi (pulverized).
- Tallassee - from the Muscogee talwa hasi (old town).
- Tensaw and Tensaw River - Etymology is unclear. May be related to the Natchez teansa.
- Tibbie - a shortened form of the Choctaw word "oakibbeha". Oakibbeha means "blocks of ice therein," with okti meaning "ice" and the plural form abeha meaning "to be in".
- Tuscumbia - from the Choctaw words tashka (warrior) and abi (killer).
- Tuskegee – from the Koasati phrase tasquiqui, meaning "warriors".
- Uchee – named after the Yuchi people, whose name roughly translates to mean "sitting at a distance".
  - Shared with the Uchee Creek.
- Wedowee - a given name, meaning "old water" given by a muscogean chief
- Weogufka - from Creek wi, “water”, plus ogufki, “muddy” also Creek Indian for the Mississippi.
- Wetumpka – from the Muscogee phrase wewau tumcau, meaning "rumbling water".

=== Bodies of water ===
- Buttahatchee River - from the Choctaw words bati (sumac) and hahcha (river).
- Chattahoochee River - from the Muskogean words chato (rock) and huchi (marked).
- Chattooga River - may derive from the Cherokee word jitaaga (chicken) or Muscogee cato (rock).
- Choctawhatchee River - Choctaw word hacha (river) and the name for the tribe, literally the "River of the Choctaws".
- Luxapallila Creek - from Choctaw words luksi a balali (turtles crawl there)
- Noxubee River - derived from Choctaw word nakshobi (to stink).
- Quilby Creek, creek in Sumter County. Name derived from the Choctaw language purported to mean "creek where the panther was killed".
- Sea Warrior Creek, creek in Choctaw County. "Sea Warrior" is the result of a name corrupted from the Choctaw language (Isawaya) purported to mean "crouching deer".
- Sepulga River - possibly from the Muscogee svwokle, a tribal town.
- Sipsey River - from the Choctaw word sipsi (cottonwood).
- Sucarnoochee River - probably from the Choctaw words shokha (hog) and hachcha (stream).
- Tensaw River
- Tombigbee River - from the Choctaw words Itte-ombee-eye ika-abee (wooden box making river).
- Waxahatchee Creek - from the Muscogee wakse (a clan name) and hacci (stream).

=== Other ===
- Cheaha Mountain - derived from the Choctaw word chaha, meaning "high".

== See also ==
- List of place names in the United States of Native American origin
