= List of ghost towns in Alabama =

This is an incomplete list of ghost towns in Alabama, United States.

== Classification ==
=== Barren site ===
- Sites no longer in existence
- Sites that have been destroyed
- Covered with water
- Reverted to pasture
- May have a few difficult to find foundations/footings at most

=== Neglected site ===
- Only rubble left
- All buildings uninhabited
- Roofless building ruins
- Some buildings or houses still standing, but majority are roofless

=== Abandoned site ===
- Building or houses still standing
- Buildings and houses all abandoned
- No population, except caretaker
- Site no longer in existence except for one or two buildings, for example old church, grocery store

=== Semi-abandoned site ===
- Building or houses still standing
- Buildings and houses largely abandoned
- Few residents
- Many abandoned buildings
- Small population

=== Historic community ===
- Building or houses still standing
- Still a busy community
- Smaller than its boom years
- Population has decreased dramatically, to one fifth or less.

== Ghost towns ==
Town name	Other name	County	Established	Disestablished	Current status	Remarks
Aigleville		Marengo	1818	1830s	Barren	Established by French Vine and Olive colonists
Arcola	Arcola Ferry	Hale	1820s	1850s	Historic	Established by French Vine and Olive colonists
Bainbridge	Bam Bridge, Bambridge	Colbert, Lauderdale	1819	1840s	Submerged	Under Wilson Lake
Barnesville		Marion			Historic	
Battelle		DeKalb			Neglected	
Beaver Mills	Beaver Meadow	Mobile			Neglected	Site of a uniform depot during Civil War
Belle Fontaine	Bellefontaine, Belle Fountaine, Bellefountain, Bell Fountain, Belfont	Baldwin	Bef. 1775		Historic	Stagecoach stop and supper stand
Bellefonte		Jackson	1821	1920s	Neglected	Former county seat of Jackson County
Blakeley		Baldwin	1813	1865	Neglected	Former county seat of Baldwin County
Blanche		Cherokee			Barren	Site at intersection of State Route 35 and State Route 273
Bluff City	Bluff, Monroe	Morgan	1818	1881		
Bluffton		Cherokee	1887	1934	Barren	Former iron ore mining town
Boston		Franklin				
Brownville		Tuscaloosa	1925	Approx. 1989	Abandoned / demolished	Former company town for W.P. Brown and Sons Lumber Co., some plots still visible near intersection of Tabernacle Road and Brownville Pike Road in Northwestern Tuscaloosa County
Cahaba		Dallas	1819	1865	Abandoned	First capital of Alabama, from 1820-1826
Cadle	Ardela, Cadle Station	Bibb	c. 1890	c. 1900s	Barren	Railroad flag stop on the Southern Railway, named for Cornelius Cadle, co-founder of the Cahaba Coal Mining Company; later known as Ardela (mapped 1902–1971)
Cedric		Randolph				Four miles southwest of Roanoke
Centerdale		Morgan				
Chandler Springs		Talladega	1832	1918	Abandoned	Nationally famous resort town, from 1832-1918
Choctaw Corner		Clarke			Barren	Area now part of Thomasville
Chulafinnee Placers		Cleburne	1835	1840s		
Claiborne		Monroe	1816	1870s	Abandoned	One of the largest settlements in early Alabama
Clarkesville	Clarkeville	Clarke	1819	1860s	Barren	First county seat of Clarke County
Dumphries		Washington	1819	1839		
Erie		Hale	1819	1855	Barren	Former county seat of Hale County
Failetown		Clarke				Site of the Bashi Skirmish a battle during the Creek War.
Finchburg	Finchburgh, Finchberg	Monroe				Amasa Coleman Lee, the father of Harper Lee did live in this town.
Fitzpatrick		Bullock			Historic	
Fort Gaines		Mobile			Historic	Defensive fort on Mobile Bay. Now serves as a museum and tourist attraction on Dauphin Island.
Fort McClellan		Calhoun	1912	1999	Abandoned/historic	Former army base outside of Anniston
Fort Morgan		Baldwin				Defensive fort on Mobile Bay
Gantts Quarry		Talladega	1830	2000	Abandoned	Former mining town
Gold Log Mine		Talladega				Former gold mining camp
Houston		Winston			Historic	Former county seat of Winston County
Kaulton		Tuscaloosa	1912		Barren	Former Kaul Lumber Company company town and mill site; now part of Tuscaloosa
Kowaliga	Benson, Kowaliga Industrial Community	Elmore, later Tallapoosa	c. 1890	c. 1926	Barren and submerged	Former historically African-American community with a focus on industry, was partially submerged under Lake Martin after the creation of Martin Dam.
Louina		Randolph	1834	1905		At one time the largest town in Randolph County
Manasco		Walker				
Massillon		Dallas				
Minden		Calhoun				
Montezuma	Covington Courthouse	Covington			Now a neighborhood of River Falls	First county seat of Covington County
Morgan Stream						
Mountain Mills		Colbert	1872	1893	Barren	Former home of large cotton mill
Nottingham	Jones Camp Ground	Talladega	1880s	1895		Steel town
Odena	Shirtee Plantation, Odena Plantation, Oden's Mill	Talladega			Barren	
Old Ramer		Montgomery	1850	1895		
Pansey		Houston				The 28th Lieutenant Governor of Alabama, Lucy Baxley who served from 2003 to 2007 was born here.
Pikeville		Marion				First county seat of Marion County
Prairie Bluff	Prairie Blue, Dale, Daletown	Wilcox	1819	1870s	Submerged	Former Alabama River shipping port
Riverton	Point Smith 1846-1851, Chickasaw 1851-1890, Riverton 1890-1930s	Colbert	1846	1930s	Submerged	Former Tennessee River port town, now underwater due to the construction of the Pickwick Landing Dam. The only current remnant of Riverton is a cemetery located along the Rose Trail
Rockcastle	Davis Creek	Tuscaloosa				
St. Stephens		Washington	1789		Historic	First territorial capital of Alabama
Stanton		Chilton				
Tooktocaugee		Calhoun			Barren	Former Creek Indian village
Turkey Town		Cherokee	1770		Barren	Former Creek Indian village
Valhermoso Springs	Chunn Springs, Manning Springs, Valhermosa Springs, White Sulpher Springs	Morgan				Former health resort
Vienna		Pickens				Former Tombigbee River port.
Washington		Autauga	1817	1879	Barren/submerged	First county seat of Autauga County
Bell Fontaine	Bell Fountain	Baldwin	ca. 1760	1880s	Abandoned/replaced	Former stagecoach stop and settlement
