= Beaver Mills =

Beaver Mills may refer to a location in the United States:

- Beaver Mills, Alabama, a ghost town
- Beaver Mills (Keene, New Hampshire), a registered historic place

See also

- Beaver Mill, a mill in North Adams, Massachusetts
