= Loraine Bedsole Bush Tunstall =

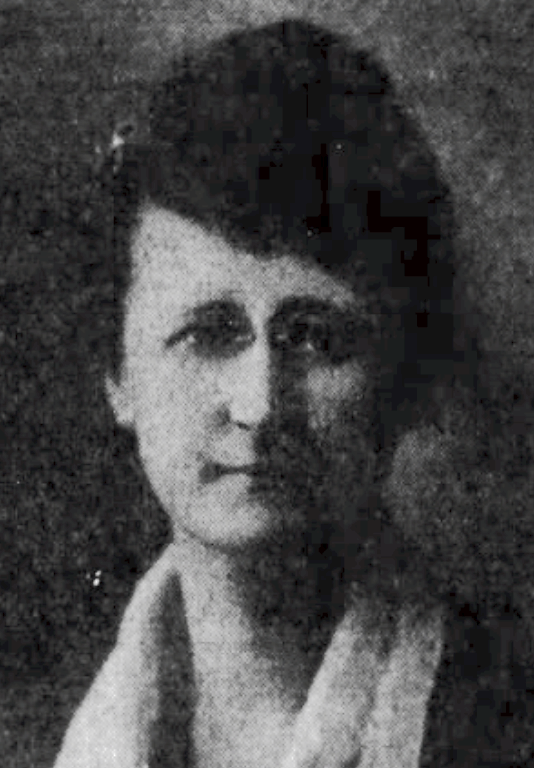
Loraine Bedsole Bush Tunstall (1924)

Loraine Bedsole Bush Tunstall (née, Bedsole; after first marriage, Bush; after second marriage, Tunstall; 1881–1953) was an American social reformer who served as the first director of Alabama's department focused on child welfare, in which capacity she attained national distinction. She was the first woman to ever head a state department in Alabama. She also served as Alabama child labor inspector (1915–17) and was on the staff of the United States Department of Labor (1918–19).

== Early life and education ==
Lorena (nickname, "Loraine") Bedsole was born May 11, 1881, in Clarke County, Alabama. She was the daughter of Travis Linyer and Martha (Goodman) Bedsole; the former born at DeFuniak Springs, Florida, the latter of Georgia. The Bedsole family was of German descent. She was a granddaughter of Edward and Susan (Blackwell) Bedsole, of North Carolina, and of Matthew and Mary (Sheffield) Goodman, of Georgia. She had several younger siblings including: Joseph, Oceola, Travis (who became Alabama state senator), James, Matthew, and Massey.

Her education was secured under a governess at Tallahatta Springs, the Thomasville high school, The Atheneum, and in special study in Washington, D.C.

== Career ==
Tunstall was deputy child labor inspector for two and a half years during the administration of Dr. William Henry Oates; and served for a time in the Children's Bureau of the United States Department of Health and Human Services , as U.S. factory inspector. She later went with the National Child Labor Committee, headquartered in New York City, charged with the duty of securing child welfare legislation in several states.

Early in 1919, Tunstall returned to Alabama and was largely instrumental in securing the passage of the child labor bill, as well as the law establishing the State child welfare department. In this work, she was assisted by Thomas M. Owen, who had become her friend. She was elected as the first director of this department, on December 5, 1919, a position she held until 1935. (Note: According to the wedding notice in the Greensboro Watchman (1924), she resigned this position shortly before her second marriage in April 1924.) Under her able direction, the work of the child welfare department of Alabama attracted nationwide attention.

== Personal life ==
On March 9, 1909, at Thomasville, she married Dr. Charles Fletcher Bush (1878-1910), who was then State prison inspector, son of Dr. B. W. and Mary (Hudson) Bush, of Thomasville. They made their home in that city. In 1910, he was appointed by Governor Comer as the head of the state prison and factory inspection department, serving in that capacity until his death. He was succeeded by Oates, who subsequently, in 1915, appointed Mrs. Bush as deputy child labor inspector.

On April 29, 1924, in Mobile, Alabama, she married Alfred Moore Tunstall (1863-1935), of Greensboro. He served for many years in the state legislature. He was the Speaker of the Alabama House of Representatives of 1923 and had a prominent part in the work of the Brandon legislature. He also served as state chair for the Underwood forces in their successful fight to secure the Alabama declaration for Underwood in his campaign for president of the United States.

Loraine Bedsole Bush Tunstall died in Mobile, Alabama, August 19, 1953.
