= Turner's Fort =

United States historic site in Alabama

- Campbell, Alabama in United States
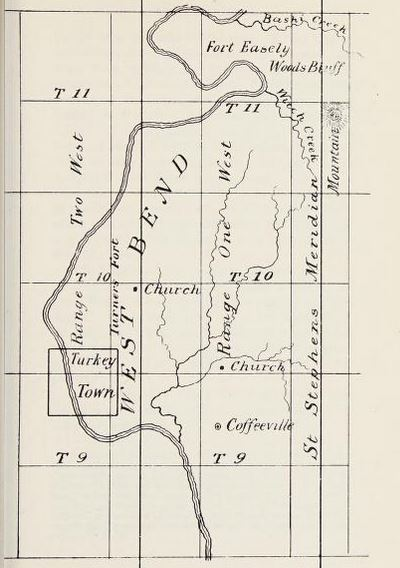
- Location of Turner's Fort, inside West Bend of the Alabama River

Site information
- Type: Stockade fort
- Owner: Private
- Controlled by: Private
- Open to the public: No

Location
- Location within Alabama Location within the United States
- Coordinates: 31°50′10″N 88°08′28″W

Site history
- Built: 1813
- Built by: Mississippi Territory settlers
- In use: 1813
- Battles/wars: Creek War

Turner's Fort, also known as Fort Turner, was a stockade fort built in 1813 in present-day Clarke County, Alabama during the Creek War (part of the larger War of 1812). Turner's Fort, like many other forts built around the same time, was built in response to Red Stick attacks on settlers in the surrounding area.

Turner's Fort was built in the spring of 1813 around the home of Abner Turner. The fort was located in the West Bend community near the eastern bank of the Alabama River in Clarke County and was eight miles south and five miles west of Fort Easley. The Choctaw village of Turkey Town was located three miles south of the fort. The stockade fort had palisades constructed of doubled-walls of split pine logs and contained two or three blockhouses. Thirteen men and boys offered protection for the fort's occupants.

In August 1813, the occupants of Turner's Fort attended a camp meeting at Fort Easley.

In September 1813, the occupants of Turner's Fort and Fort Easley abandoned their positions and fled to St. Stephens for greater protection.

The Turner Corn Crib at the Clarke County Historical Museum is thought to be constructed from timbers taken from Turner's Fort.

Tandy Walker, who served as an interpreter for the Choctaws and rescued a Mrs. Crawley from Red Stick captivity, spent time at Turner's Fort.
