= Morvin, Alabama =

Unincorporated community in Alabama, United States

- Unincorporated community
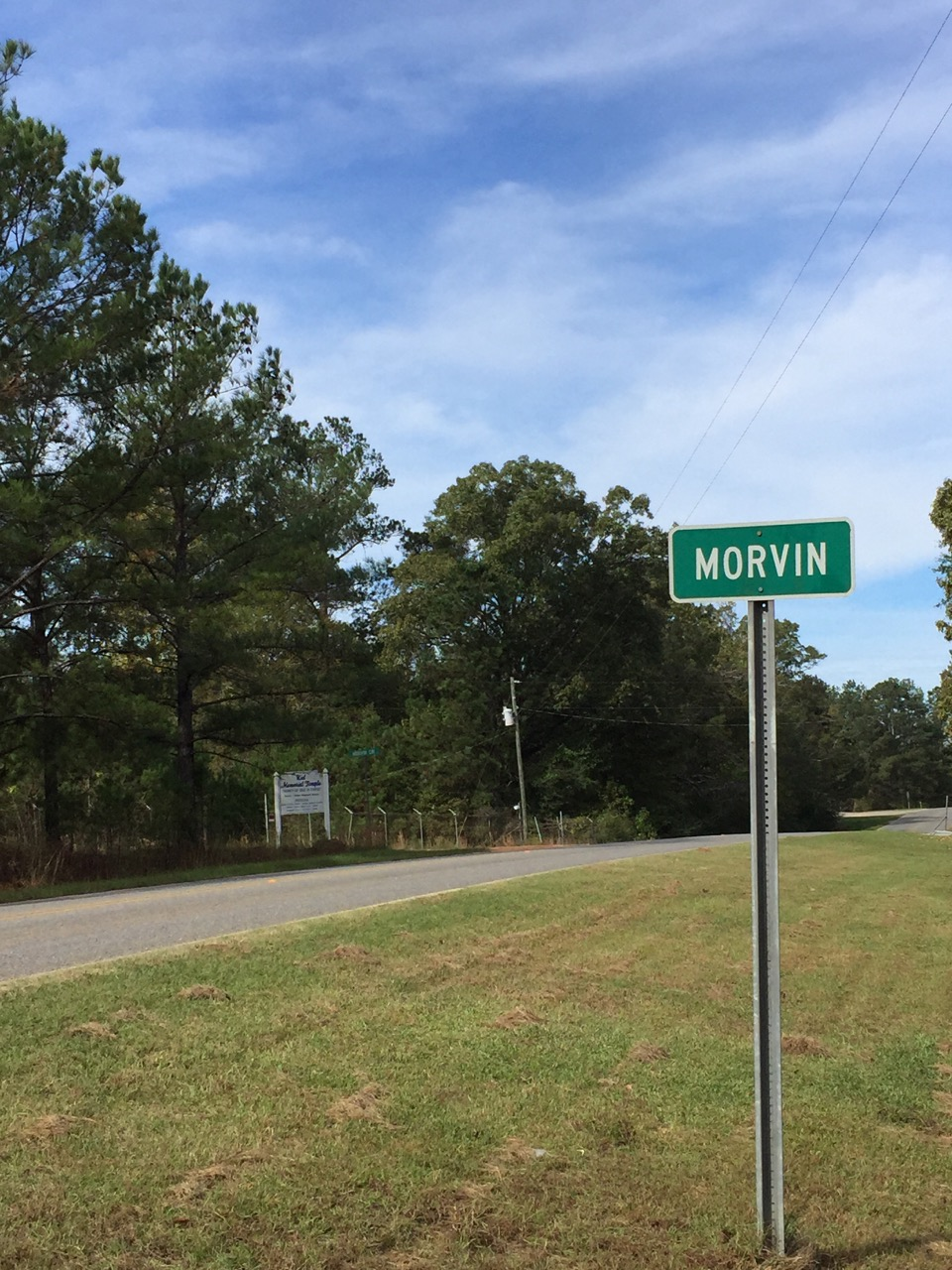
- Approaching Morvin on Alabama Highway 69 North

- Location within the state of Alabama Morvin, Alabama (the United States)
- Coordinates: 31°59′6″N 87°59′34.8″W
- Country: United States
- State: Alabama
- County: Clarke
- Time zone: UTC-6 (Central (CST))
  - Summer (DST): UTC-5 (CDT)
- Area code: 334

Morvin is an unincorporated community in Clarke County, Alabama, United States.

== Geography ==
Morvin is located at 31.985°N 87.993°W. and is intersected by Alabama State Route 69 and Clarke County Highway 20.

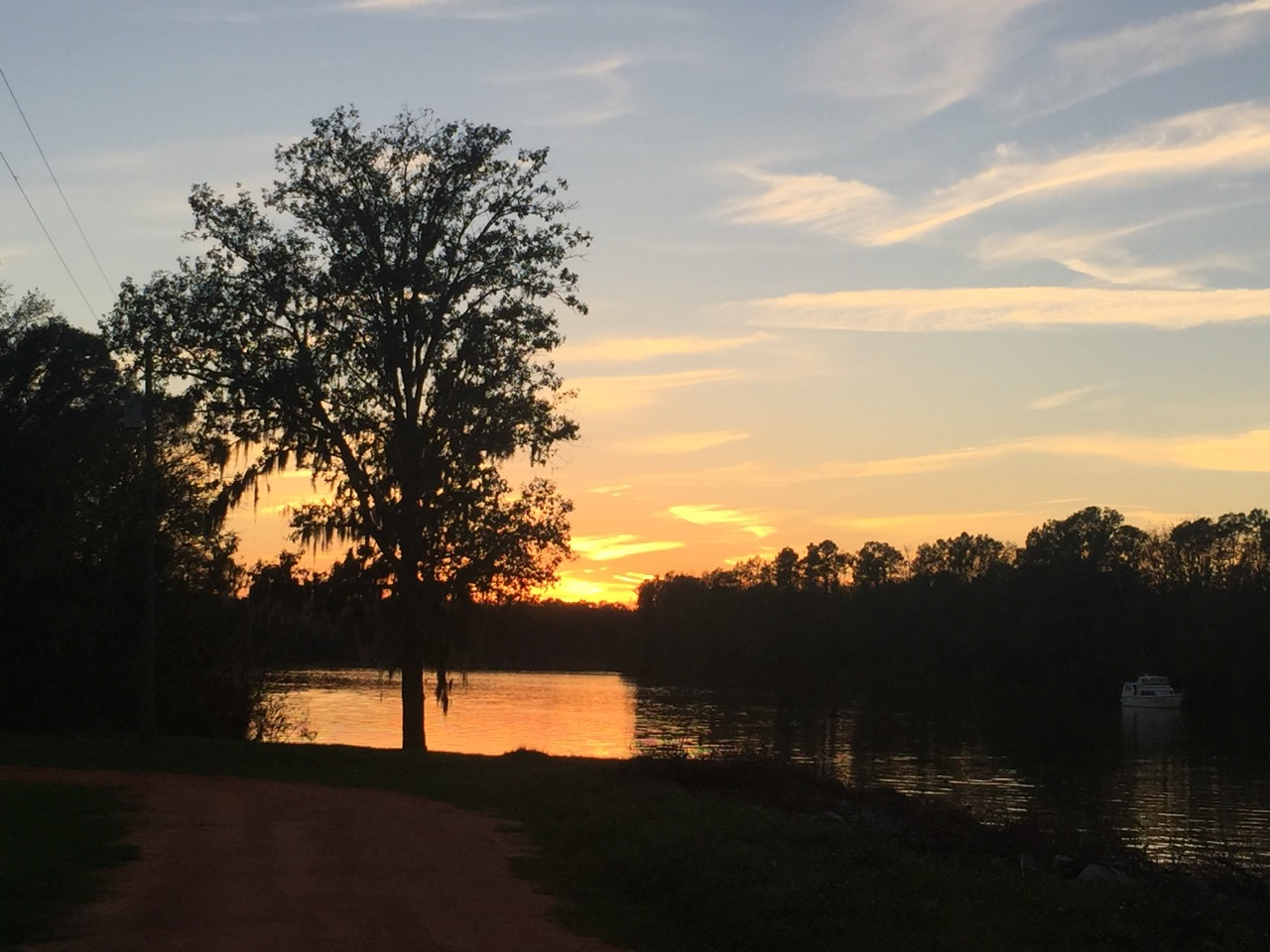
Sunset on Bashi Creek and the Tombigbee River at the Bashi Creek Public Use Area near Morvin.
