= Fort Landrum =

United States historic site in Alabama

- Salitpa, Alabama in United States

Site information
- Type: Stockade fort
- Owner: Private
- Controlled by: Private
- Open to the public: No

Location
- Location within Alabama Location within the United States
- Coordinates: 31°40′04″N 87°54′42″W

Site history
- Built: 1813
- Built by: Mississippi Territory settlers
- In use: 1813-1819
- Battles/wars: Creek War

Fort Landrum was a stockade fort built in 1813 in present-day Clarke County, Alabama, United States, during the Creek War (part of the larger War of 1812). The fort was located eleven miles west of Fort Sinquefield. Fort Landrum, like many other forts built around the same time, was built in response to Red Stick attacks on settlers in the surrounding area.

Fort Landrum was built around the home of John Landrum, a veteran of the Revolutionary War who moved to the area in 1803 from Warren County, Georgia.

In 1813, the fort became the site of the first courthouse in Clarke County. A courthouse remained here until 1819.

A historical marker was erected in 1977 near the site of Fort Landrum by the Clarke County Historical Society.
