= Bedsole =

Bedsole is a surname. Notable people with the surname include:

- Ann Bedsole (1930–2025), American politician, businesswoman, community activist, and philanthropist
- Hal Bedsole (1941–2017), American football player
- Loraine Bedsole Bush Tunstall (1881–1953), American social reformer
- Russell Bedsole (born 1975), American politician and law enforcement officer

== See also ==
- McEntyre, Alabama, an unincorporated community also known as Bedsole
