= Kathryn Tucker Windham =

American journalist, author and photographer (1918–2011)

- Windham on her balcony in Selma in 2007
- Born: Kathryn Tucker; June 2, 1918; Selma, Alabama, U.S.
- Died: June 12, 2011 (aged 93); Selma, Alabama, U.S.
- Occupations: Journalist, short story writer, storyteller, photographer
- Writing career
- Subjects: Fiction, non-fiction

Kathryn Tucker Windham (née Tucker, June 2, 1918 – June 12, 2011) was an American storyteller, author, photographer, folklorist, and journalist. She was born in Selma, Alabama, and grew up in nearby Thomasville.

Tucker got her first writing job at the age of 12, reviewing movies for her cousin's small town newspaper, The Thomasville Times. She earned a B.A. degree from Huntingdon College in 1939. Soon after graduating she became the first woman journalist for the Alabama Journal. Starting in 1944, she worked for The Birmingham News.

In 1946 she married Amasa Benjamin Windham, with whom she had three children. In 1956 she went to work at the Selma Times-Journal, where she won several Associated Press awards for her writing and photography. She died on June 12, 2011. She was a longtime friend of artist Nall, who introduced her works to the art world at large.

== Ghost stories ==
Kathryn Tucker Windham wrote a series of books of "true" ghost stories, based on local folklore, beginning with 13 Alabama Ghosts and Jeffrey (1969). Other titles were Jeffrey Introduces 13 More Southern Ghosts (1971), 13 Georgia Ghosts and Jeffrey (1973), 13 Mississippi Ghosts and Jeffrey (1974), 13 Tennessee Ghosts and Jeffrey (1976), and Jeffrey's Latest 13: More Alabama Ghosts (1982). In 2004, she published Jeffrey's Favorite 13 Ghost Stories, which was a collection of featured stories from previous books.

=== Jeffrey ===
Jeffrey is a purported ghost that took up residence in the Windham house in October 1966. According to a letter printed in the foreword to 13 Alabama Ghosts and Jeffrey, Windham became interested in ghost stories after this ghost began to haunt her family. At first, the family heard footsteps in rooms that would later be found empty. Sometimes, objects had been moved.

A photo allegedly of Jeffrey was accidentally taken when some young people visiting the Windham home decided to play with a Ouija board in an effort to contact the ghost. When photos from that night were developed, a dark shadowy blot with a vaguely human-like shape was found to be in one image. Soon after this picture was taken, Windham contacted Margaret Gillis Figh, who was a noted collector of ghost stories, to ask about Jeffrey. Out of that meeting, the idea for 13 Alabama Ghosts and Jeffrey was inspired.

== Storytelling ==
Following an invitation to speak at the National Storytelling Festival in Jonesborough, Tennessee, Windham began to gain attention for storytelling. She often appeared at storytelling events, historical meetings and classrooms. Her stories about ghosts and growing up and living in the Southern United States have earned her a place on National Public Radio's All Things Considered, which brought her national attention and praise. She also performed stories and gave commentaries on Alabama Public Radio's Alabama Life. Mrs. Windham's commentaries were recorded by APR producers Samuel Hendren, Jason Norton and Brett Tannehill. Her commentaries still air the first weekday of every month on 89.3 WLRH Huntsville Public Radio's Sundial Writers Corner.

Windham is the founder of the Alabama Tale Tellin' Festival, which has been held annually in Selma since 1978. Windham performed on stage in a one-woman play about Julia Tutwiler. Named They Call Me Julia, the work was based on Windham's book of the same name.

== Museum ==
The Thomasville campus of Coastal Alabama Community College is the site of the Kathryn Tucker Windham Museum. Her personal papers and manuscripts from 1939 to 2010 were donated to the special collections department of the Auburn University Libraries.

== Honors and awards ==
- In 1990, Windham received the University of Alabama's Society of Fine Arts’ Alabama Arts Award.
- On December 14, 1993, she was awarded the Honorary Degree Doctor of Literature from the University of Montevallo.
- In 1995, Windham was honored as the Selma Rotary Club's Citizen of the Year.
- In 1995, she received the Alabama State Council on the Arts Governor's Arts Awards.
- In 1996, she received the National Storytelling Association's Circle of Excellence Award and Lifetime Achievement Award.
- In 2000, she was selected as one of thirteen artists to represent Alabama as part of "Artists of Alabama 2000."
- In 2000, she received the Alabama Humanities Award.
- On October 4, 2001, Windham was inducted into the University of Alabama College of Communications Hall of Fame.
- On August 18, 2003, she was inducted into the Alabama Academy of Honor, having been nominated by the novelist Harper Lee, also from that state.
- In 2008, Windham was named ABA Citizen of the Year by the Alabama Broadcasters Association.
- In 2009, she received the Alabama Living Legacy Award from the Alabama State Council on the Arts.

== Film ==
The 2004 documentary film, Kathryn: The Story of a Teller, directed by Norton Dill, chronicles Windham's life and varied careers.

== Bibliography ==
- Treasured Alabama Recipes, Strode Publishers (1964)
- 13 Alabama Ghosts and Jeffrey, Strode Publishers (1969), ISBN 978-0-8173-0376-1
- Exploring Alabama, Strode Publishers (1970)
- Jeffrey Introduces 13 More Southern Ghosts, Strode Publishers (1971), ISBN 978-0-8173-0381-5
- Treasured Tennessee Recipes, Strode Publishers (1972)
- Treasured Georgia Recipes, Strode Publishers (1973)
- 13 Georgia Ghosts and Jeffrey, Strode Publishers (1973), ISBN 978-0-8173-0377-8
- 13 Mississippi Ghosts and Jeffrey, Strode Publishers (1974), ISBN 978-0-8173-0379-2
- Southern Cooking to Remember, Strode Publishers (1974), ISBN 978-0-87397-098-3
- Alabama: One Big Front Porch, Strode Publishers (1975), ISBN 978-0-87397-089-1
- 13 Tennessee Ghosts and Jeffrey, Strode Publishers (1976), ISBN 978-0-87397-108-9
- The Ghost in the Sloss Furnaces, Birmingham Historical Society and AmSouth Bank (1978)
- Count Those Buzzards! Stamp Those Grey Mules!: Superstitions remembered from a Southern childhood, Strode Publishers (1979), ISBN 978-0-87397-149-2
- Jeffrey's Latest 13: More Alabama Ghosts, Strode Publishers (1982), ISBN 978-0-87397-232-1
- Terrible Legends in America, Seibido (1986) ISBN 978-4-7919-0037-4
- A Serigamy of Stories, University Press of Mississippi (1988), ISBN 978-0-87805-354-4
- Odd-egg Editor, University Press of Mississippi (1990), ISBN 978-0-585-18010-6
- The Autobiography of a Bell, United Methodist Children's Home (1991)
- My Name is Julia, Birmingham Public Library Press (1991) ISBN 978-0-942301-18-2
- A Sampling of Selma Stories, Selma Printing Service (1991)
- Twice Blessed, Black Belt Press (1996) ISBN 978-1-881320-47-0
- Encounters, Black Belt Press (1997), ISBN 978-1-881320-94-4
- The Bridal Wreath Bush, Black Belt Press (1999), ISBN 978-1-880216-92-7
- Piano Lessons and Other Recollections, Major Tiara Press (2000)
- It's Christmas!, River City Publishers (2002), ISBN 978-1-57966-031-4
- Common Threads : Photographs and Stories from the South CKM Press (2004) ISBN 978-0-9636713-1-8
- Jeffrey's Favorite 13 Ghost Stories, New South Books (2004), ISBN 978-1-58838-170-5
- Ernest's Gift, Junebug Books (2004), ISBN 978-1-58838-149-1
- Twice Blessed, River City Publishers (2007), ISBN 978-1-57966-080-2
- Spit, Scarey Ann, and Sweat Bees: One Thing Leads to Another, NewSouth Books (2009), ISBN 978-1-58838-240-5
- She: The Old Woman Who Took Over My Life, NewSouth Books (2011), ISBN 978-1-58838-278-8
