= Barnesville, Alabama =

- Unincorporated community
- Location within Alabama Location within the United States
- Coordinates: 34°08′23″N 88°04′40″W
- Country: United States
- State: Alabama
- County: Marion
- Elevation: 525 ft (160 m)
- Time zone: UTC-6 (Central (CST))
  - Summer (DST): UTC-5 (CDT)
- Area codes: 205, 659
- GNIS feature ID: 157886

Barnesville is a ghost town in Marion County, Alabama, United States. Two churches still remain in the town. A scattered populace still occupies Barnesville.

A post office operated under the name Barnesville from 1855 to 1907.

== See also ==
- List of ghost towns in Alabama
