= Five Points: A Journal of Literature and Art =

Georgia State University publication

Founded in 1996, Five Points: A Journal of Literature and Art is published by the Georgia State University Department of English and is edited by Megan Sexton. Each issue features poetry, fiction, essays, and interviews. Five Points is ranked in the top ten magazines in the nation by Every Writer's Resource. Works first published in Five Points have been selected to appear in Best American Short Stories, Best American Poetry, O’Henry Prize Stories, Pushcart Best of the Small Presses, New Stories from the South, Utne Reader, Harper’s, and Poetry Daily. Previous contributors include Richard Bausch, Ann Beattie, Frederick Busch, Edward Hirsch, Barbara Hamby, David Kirby, Philip Levine, Sean Gill, W.S. Merwin, Joyce Carol Oates, Beth Ann Fennelly, Naomi Shihab Nye, Ellen Bryant Voigt, Christine Stewart, Martin Walls, Charles Wright and many others.
