= Alma, Alabama =

Unincorporated community in Alabama, United States

- Unincorporated community
- Location within the state of Alabama Alma, Alabama (the United States)
- Coordinates: 31°27′51″N 87°45′14″W
- Country: United States
- State: Alabama
- County: Clarke
- Elevation: 259 ft (79 m)
- Time zone: UTC-6 (Central (CST))
  - Summer (DST): UTC-5 (CDT)
- ZIP code: 36501
- Area code: 251
- GNIS feature ID: 155989

Alma is an unincorporated community in Clarke County, Alabama, United States. The community was named for Alma Flinn, a local teacher.

== Demographics ==
According to the returns from 1850–2010 for Alabama, it has never reported a population figure separately on the U.S. Census.
