= Minden, Alabama =

- Ghost town
- Location within Alabama
- Coordinates: 33°42′08″N 86°06′22″W
- Country: United States
- State: Alabama
- County: Calhoun
- Elevation: 486 ft (148 m)
- Time zone: UTC-6 (Central (CST))
  - Summer (DST): UTC-5 (CDT)
- GNIS feature ID: 166224

Minden is a ghost town in Calhoun County, Alabama, United States. It possessed a post office during 1878 and 1879.
