= Alfred Moore Tunstall =

American lawyer and politician

Alfred Moore Tunstall (1863 – May 28, 1935) was a lawyer and politician in Alabama. He served in the Alabama House of Representatives including as Speaker of the Alabama House of Representatives in 1923. He was a Democrat.

He was the son of Wiley C. and Augusta Elizabeth née Hobson Tunstall. He attended Southern University and graduated with B.F. and LLB degrees from the University of Alabama. He was a lawyer in Greensboro, Alabama. He represented Hale County, Alabama in the Alabama House of Representatives from 1896 to 1909 and in the Alabama Senate in 1911 and from 1915 to 1919.

He was married to social reformer Loraine Bedsole Bush Tunstall.

Wiley Croom Tunstall, a state senator who represented Calhoun County, Alabama was his brother.

The 1935 Alabama Official and Statistical Register Report has a dedication page to him facing his image on the prior page.
