= Failetown, Alabama =

Failetown
- Ghost town
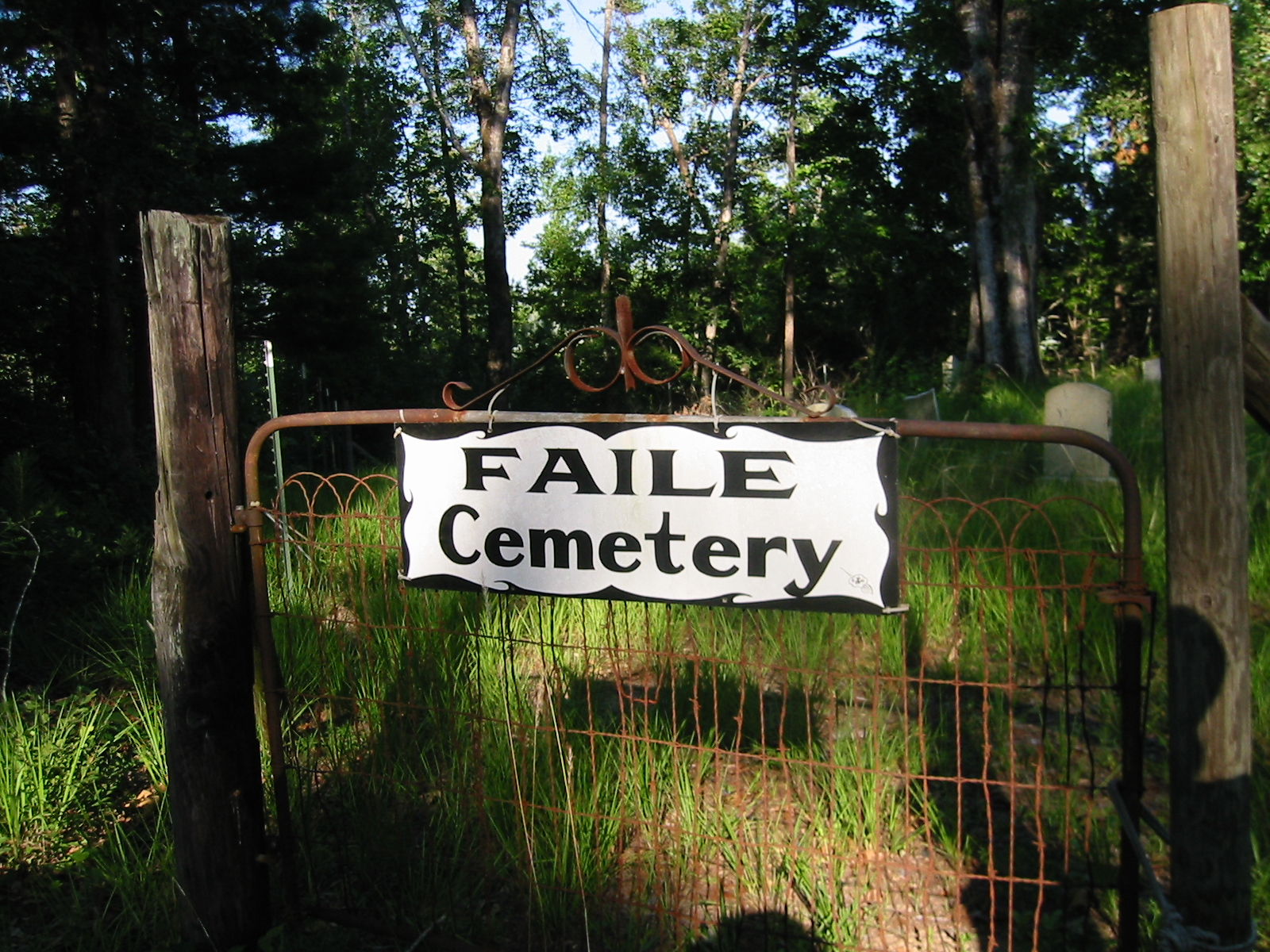
- The cemetery in Failetown, Alabama in 2005

- Location within the state of Alabama
- Coordinates: 31°55′42″N 88°0′58″W
- Country: United States
- State: Alabama
- County: Clarke
- Time zone: UTC-6 (Central (CST))
  - Summer (DST): UTC-5 (CDT)

Failetown is a ghost town in Clarke County, Alabama, United States.

== Geography ==
Failetown was located at 31°55'42.46" North, 88°00'58.16" West (31.928432, -88.016161).

== History ==
Lewis Faile and his children, Richmond, Terrell and Morgan Faile settled Failetown in the 1850s when they moved west from South Carolina. Today the town sits abandoned. The Faile Cemetery, Post Office, and homes in various states of decay are all that remain of the town today.

On October 4, 1813 the Bashi Skirmish of the Creek War was fought in Failetown. A Clarke County historical marker which stands on Woods Bluff Road between Alabama 69 and Cassidy Hill marks the location.
