= Mitcham War =

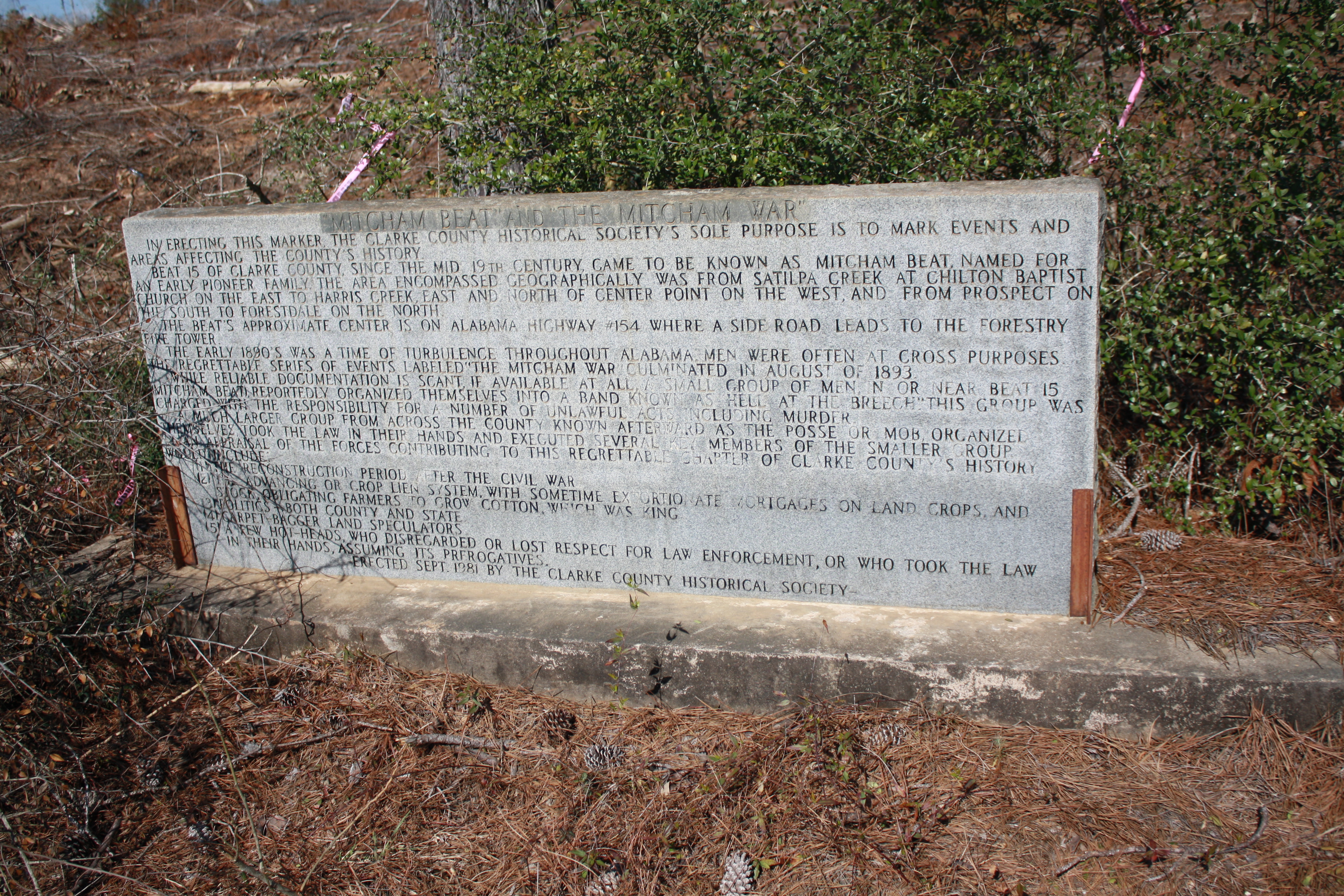
Historical marker detailing Mitcham Beat and the Mitchum War. near McEntyre, Alabama.

The Mitcham War was a bloody conflict that occurred in Clarke County, Alabama in the early 1890s.

The conflict was between rural farmers in remote section of Clarke County named Mitcham Beat and merchants in Coffeeville and other towns near the Mitcham Beat. Some accounts characterize the conflict as resulting from the 1892 elections that left rural whites disenfranchised and angry and resulting in racial violence.

Around 1890, a group of young rural men formed a secret society called "Hell-at-the-Breech" that believed their local economy was being controlled by a small group. On December 25, 1892, the gang entered Coffeeville and murdered a prominent businessman.

Soon a vigilante mob of 500 formed to seek the Hell-at-the-Breech murderers, and eventually killed 5 men.

Different sources have the violence continuing until fall of 1893 after the Hell-at-the-breech disbanded or when the mob of Clarke County men publicly shot a prominent member of the Hell-at-the-Breech gang.

== In fiction ==
Hell at the Breech (2003) is a fictional account of the Mitcham War by novelist and Alabama native Tom Franklin (author).
