= Beth Ann Fennelly =

American poet & writer (born 1971)

- Fennelly at Association of Writers & Writing Programs 2026
- Born: May 22, 1971 (age 55)
- Education: M.F.A., University of Arkansas; B.A., Notre Dame University
- Occupations: Writer, Professor
- Spouse: Tom Franklin (author)
- Children: 1 daughter, 2 sons
- Writing career
- Genres: Poetry, Fiction, Nonfiction

Beth Ann Fennelly (born May 22, 1971) is an American poet and prose writer and was the Poet Laureate of Mississippi.

== Biography ==
She was born in New Jersey and raised in Lake Forest, Illinois. She attended Woodlands Academy of the Sacred Heart in Lake Forest, graduating in 1989. She earned a B.A. magna cum laude from the University of Notre Dame in 1993. After graduation, she taught English for a year in a coal mining city on the Czech/Polish border. She later earned an MFA from the University of Arkansas, followed by the Diane Middlebrook Fellowship at the University of Wisconsin. She taught poetry at Knox College for two years. Since 2001, she's taught poetry and non-fiction at the University of Mississippi, where she’s currently Distinguished Professor of English. She has won several teaching awards, including Outstanding Liberal Arts Teacher of the Year (2011), the University of Mississippi Humanities Teacher of the Year (2011) and the Excellence in Graduate Teaching and Mentoring Award (2019).

Fennelly's first collection of poems, Open House, won multiple awards, including the Zoo Press Poetry Prize, the 2001 Kenyon Review Prize, the Great Lakes Colleges Association Award, and a Book Sense Top Ten Poetry Pick. Her poems have been included in numerous anthologies, including three editions of The Best American Poetry. She received a grant from the National Endowment of the Arts in 2002 and she has also won a Pushcart Prize. In 2009, she received a Fulbright grant to Brazil to study the poetry of Elizabeth Bishop. Her second and third books of poetry, Tender Hooks (2004) and Unmentionables (2008), were published by W. W. Norton.

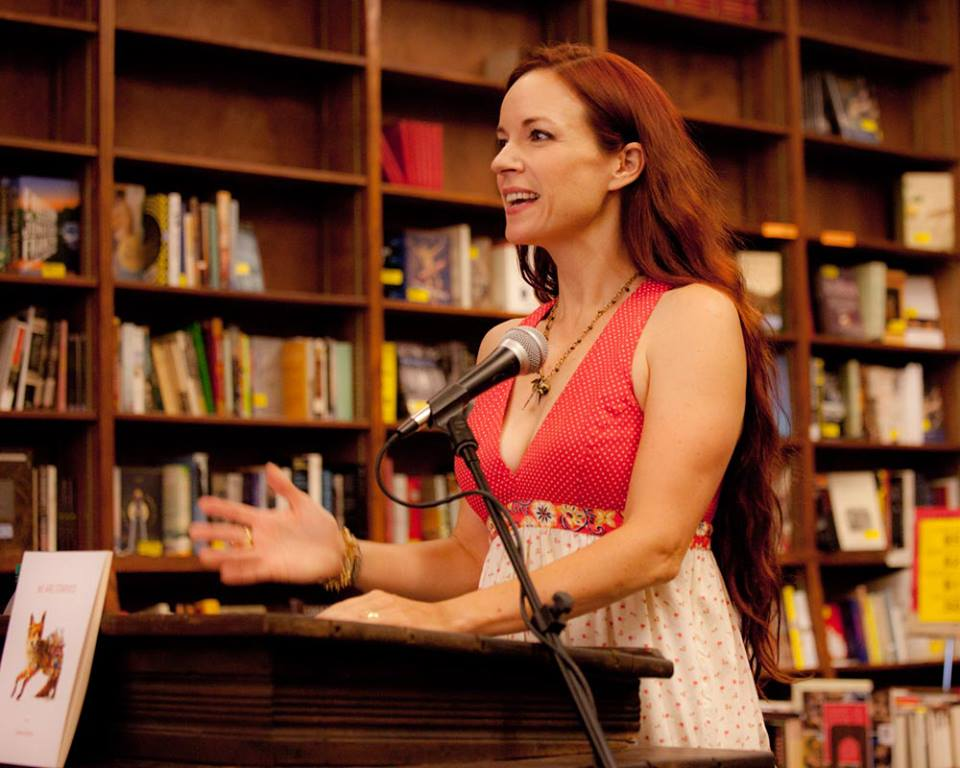
Fennelly at Off Square Books in 2013

Fennelly is a contributor to The Oxford American, where her essays frequently feature the topics of Southern food, music, and books. Her essays have appeared in Ploughshares, Poets & Writers, Ecotone, and The Virginia Quarterly Review. The Society of American Travel Writers awarded her the Lowell Prize for her work in Southern Living. She published a book of essays, Great With Child: Letters to a Young Mother, in 2006. Fennelly and her husband, Tom Franklin, co-authored a novel, The Tilted World, set during the 1927 flood of the Mississippi River. Published in 2013 by HarperCollins, it was named an IndieNext Great Read and a finalist for the 2014 SIBA Book Award and published in six foreign editions.

From 2016 to 2021, Fennelly served as Poet Laureate of Mississippi. In 2020, she was named an Academy of American Poets Laureate Fellow. She also began writing for a broader audience, publishing in The New York Times and The Washington Post, giving a TED Talk on how reading literature increases empathy, and telling a story for The Moth Radio Hour on NPR.

Fennelly is credited with creating the term “micro-memoir” to describe the hybrid genre she popularized. Micro-memoirs combine the compression of poetry with the truthing-telling of creative nonfiction. She’s been primarily writing this form since 2016, publishing in such magazines as Creative Nonfiction, The Southern Review, Five Points, The Normal School, Guernica, and The Missouri Review. Her collection, Heating & Cooling: 52 Micro-Memoirs, was published by W. W. Norton in fall of 2017. The Atlanta Journal Constitution named it a “Best Southern Book of 2017” and it was awarded the 2018 Housatonic Book Award in Nonfiction.

In 2026, Fennelly published her seventh book, The Irish Goodbye: Micro-Memoirs with W. W. Norton. Work from that collection has won the Shelby Foote Essay Prize and has been selected for anthologies and textbooks, including The Best of Thirty Years of Creative Nonfiction and The Practice of Creative Writing.

She is married to novelist Tom Franklin and they have three children. They live in Oxford, Mississippi.

== Selected works ==
- Open House Poems, Zoo Press (2002) reissued by W. W. Norton (2009)
- Tender Hooks Poems, W. W. Norton (2004)
- Great with Child: Letters to a Young Mother Nonfiction, W. W. Norton (2006)
- Unmentionables Poems, W. W. Norton (2008)
- The Tilted World Novel, co-authored with Tom Franklin (author) Harper Collins (2013)
- Heating & Cooling: 52 Micro-Memoirs Nonfiction, W. W. Norton (2017)
- The Irish Goodbye: Micro-Memoirs W. W. Norton (2026)

== Selected honors and awards ==
- The Hall-Waters Prize for Excellence in Southern Writing, 2026
- The Faulkner Society’s Shelby Foote Essay Prize, 2025.
- Academy of American Poets Laureate Fellowship, 2020
- The Univ. of Mississippi CLA Faculty Achievement Award (for “unusually significant and meritorious achievement in teaching, scholarship, and service”), 2018
- The Lamar York Prize in Creative Nonfiction, The Chattahoochee Review, 2016
- Orlando Award in Nonfiction from A Room of Her Own, 2015
- The University of Notre Dame Alumni Association's Griffin Award for Outstanding Accomplishments in Writing, 2015.
- The Subiaco Award for Literary Merit, 2012.
- Mississippi Arts Commission Grant, nonfiction, 2025, fiction, 2020, nonfiction, 2015, poetry, 2010, nonfiction, 2005
- Fulbright Scholarship, Brazil, 2009
- United States Artist Grant, 2006
- The Black Warrior Review Poetry Contest, 2006
- Sewanee Writers Conference Fellowship, 2004
- National Endowment for the Arts Award, 2003
- Breadloaf Writers Conference Fellowship, 2003
- Pushcart Prize, 2001.
- State of Illinois Arts Council Grant, 2001.
- MacDowell Colony Residency, Peterborough, NH, 2000.
- The University of Arizona Poetry Center Summer Residency, 1999.

== Links to work online ==
=== Essays ===
- “What Good is Literature? Reading and the Empathetic Brain”
- “Refuge and Prospect: The Front Porch”
- “Making Much of the Moment: a Guide to the Micro-Memoir”
- "Everything But: Creating Tension in Love Poetry"
- "Fruits We’ll Never Taste"
- "My Hundred"
- "On Collaboration"
- "On Poetry and the Reallocation of Concentration: Learning to Forget"

=== Poems ===
- Eight Poems on Academy of American Poets Website
- "Kudzu Chronicles" (Author's Audio with Text and Interpretive Video)
- Micro-memoirs
- Micro-memoirs
- "Say You Waved: A Dream Song Cycle"

== Links to reviews, interviews, and multi-media ==
- Interview On Weekend Edition, NPR
- Ted Talk, “What’s the Use of Reading? On Literature and Empathy”
- Podcasts: Our New South
- Freelance Writing Direct with Estelle Erasmus: Beth Ann Fennelly on Micro-Memoir
- The Bittersweet Life
- Wild, Precious Life
- CNN Newsroom with Pamela Brown, Aug. 14, 2022
- Interview with Salvation South
- The Irish Goodbye: Micro-Memoirs, California Review of Books
- The Irish Goodbye: Micro-Memoirs, Hippocampus
- Heating & Cooling The Kenyon Review
- Heating & Cooling The Rumpus
- Reading Women Interview
- Open House Valparaiso Poetry Review
- Tender Hooks Literary Mama
- Unmentionables Smartish Pace
- Great With Child Publishers Weekly
- Kind of Dancing: An Interview with Tom Franklin & Beth Ann Fennelly Fiction Writers Review
