= Tom Franklin (author) =

US-American author

Thomas Gerald Franklin
- Born: July 7, 1963 (age 63)
- Education: M.F.A., University of Arkansas; B.A., University of South Alabama
- Occupations: Writer, professor
- Spouse: Beth Ann Fennelly
- Children: 1 daughter, 2 sons
- Writing career
- Genres: Crime fiction, regional fiction, mystery

Thomas Gerald Franklin (born July 7, 1963) is an American writer originally from Dickinson, Alabama, United States.

Franklin earned a B.A. at the University of South Alabama, in Mobile, Alabama. He completed his M.F.A. at the University of Arkansas, in 1998, where he met his wife, poet Beth Ann Fennelly.

He credits authors Rick Bass and Raymond Carver for his introduction to the realism writing style.

As of 2026 he is an associate professor at the University of Mississippi.

== Writing career ==
Franklin's first book is collection of ten short stories, Poachers (1999), the title story of which won the Edgar Award for Best Mystery Short Story.

His first novel, Hell at the Breech (2003), is a fictionalized version of a violent feud in 1892 called the Mitcham War, that took place in Clarke County, Alabama. His second novel, Smonk is about the trial of a rapist who terrorized a small town in Alabama." Franklin's most acclaimed novel, Crooked Letter, Crooked Letter (2010), which won the Crime Writers' Association Gold Dagger Award, explores racial tensions and friendships. Franklin co-wrote the novel The Tilted World (2013) with his wife Fennelly, about the Great Mississippi Flood of 1927. In 2024, he won the Harper Lee Award.

== Published works ==
- Poachers (1999) Short Stories, HarperCollins Publishers, Winner of The Edgar Award.
- Hell at the Breech (2003) Novel, HarperCollins Publishers
- Smonk (2006) Novel, HarperCollins Publishers
- Crooked Letter, Crooked Letter (2010) Novel, HarperCollins Publishers. New York Times Bestseller, Los Angeles Times Book Prize, Willie Morris Award for Southern Fiction, RT Reviewers Choice Award for Best Contemporary Mystery, U.K. Crime Writers' Association Gold Dagger Award
- The Tilted World (2013) Novel, with Beth Ann Fennelly HarperCollins
