= Belle Fontaine, Baldwin County, Alabama =

Belle Fontaine
- Ghost town
- Approximate location within the state of Alabama
- Coordinates: 30.708863°N 87.553517°W
- Country: United States
- State: Alabama
- County: Baldwin
- Time zone: UTC-6 (Central (CST))
  - Summer (DST): UTC-5 (CDT)

Bell Fontaine (also spelled as Bellefontaine, Belle Fountaine, Bellefountain, Bell Fountain, and Belfont) is a ghost town in Baldwin County, Alabama, United States.

== Toponymy ==
When translated from French to English, Bell Fontaine means "beautiful fountain." The name derives from a nearby group of springs with the same name. A nearby creek where the springs flow into is also lent the name.

== History ==
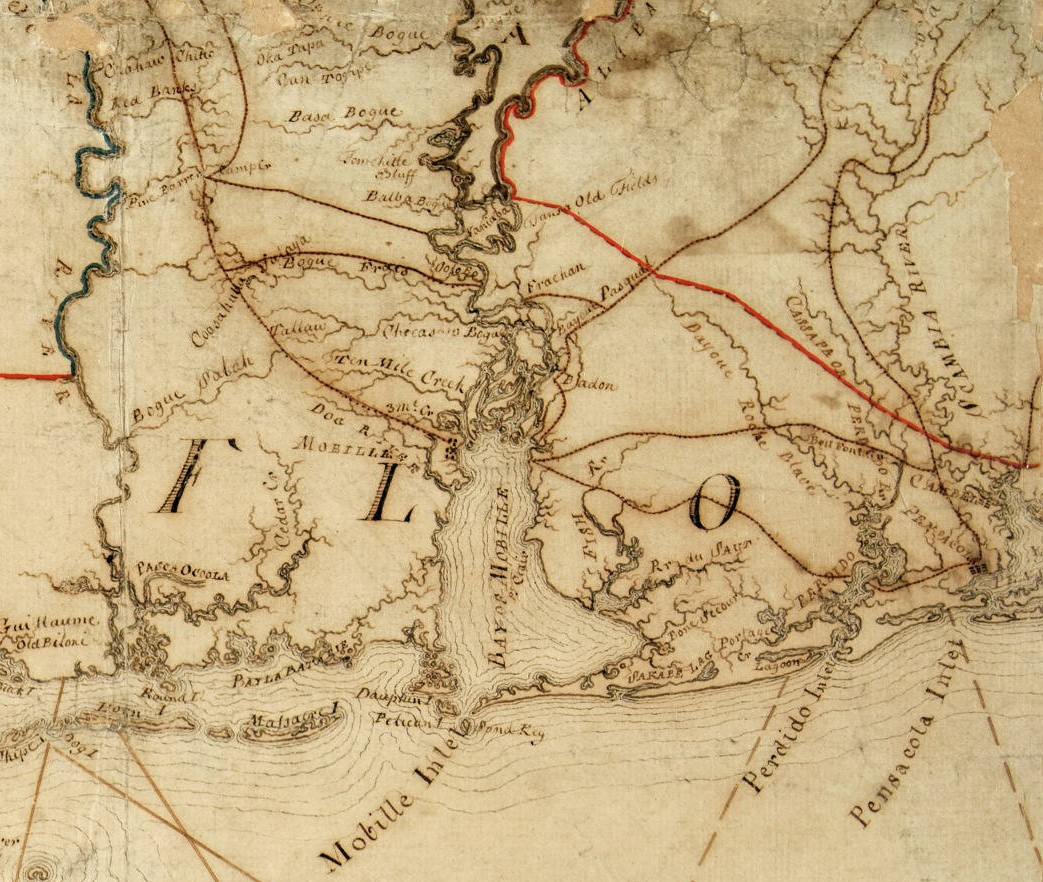
Belle Fontaine in 1775

Though lying in the peripheral of Baldwin County's history, Bell Fontaine predates much of the area. The settlement first appeared in 1775 on A Map of the Southern Indian District of North America produced by surveyor Joseph Purcell and John Stuart. Due to its appearance on early British Colonial era maps and its French name, the settlement likely dates back to the French Colonial era. It was continuously marked on maps until 1890. However, likely because of its remote location, Bell Fontaine had been mislocated in numerous maps in this time span.

Located 12 miles away from the Perdido River on the Old Pensacola Road (modern-day Baldwin County Road 112), a stagecoach stop and supper stand had been the focal point of the settlement since at least 1825. The travelers' stop served as a rest point between Mobile and Pensacola. Travelers heading to Mobile on the road had to either cross the Mobile-Tensaw Delta at Hall's Landing or Blakely. During the colonial eras, the Tensaw River plantations were also a destination for those travelling on this road. Belle Fontaine also acted as a cattle pen for local citizens.

There are few first-hand descriptions of Belle Fontaine. However, a highly detailed account comes from German Prince Carl Bernhard of Saxe-Weimar-Eisenach's Travels Through North America, During the Years 1825 and 1826. On his way from Blakely to Pensacola he writes:

The night overtook us before we reached our lodgings for the night, which we intended to take up at a place called Belle Fontaine. The road was hardly discernible, for it was so little travelled, that grass grew in the tracks, and the stumps of trees were as difficult to avoid, as they were frequent. We risked oversetting more than once. To avoid such an accident, we determined to proceed on foot. We took in this way, a walk of at least six miles, in an unbroken pine forest, inhabited by bears, wolves, and even panthers. At first we had the light of the moon; about nine o’clock it went down, and we had considerable difficulty to keep the road. As the dwellings were scattering from each other, we imitated the barking of dogs, to give them an opportunity to answer in the same language. This succeeded; we heard dogs bark, moved in the direction whence the sound came, and reached about ten o’clock, the desired Belle Fontaine, a log house with two rooms, or cabins, and a cleared opening before it. A man of rather unpromising appearance, the landlord, Mr. Pollard, admitted us, and took charge of our horses. His wife, a pale, sickly looking being, who hardly returned an answer to our questions, was obliged to rise from her bed, to prepare us a supper and sleeping-room. The whole establishment had at first, the look of a harbour for robbers, but there was well roasted venison prepared for us, on a neat table, and tolerable coffee, for which we had, luckily, brought sugar along with us. It was really comfortable, though our chamber remained open the whole night, as there was no door, and only two beds were furnished.

Prince Bernhard gives a further description of the settlement while returning to Blakely, stating:

About five o’clock in the afternoon we reached the same log-house in which we had passed the night, near Belle Fontaine. As it was still daylight, I went immediately in search of the spring to which this place owes its name; I found, however, only a marsh with several springs, about which, except the vegetation, there was nothing attractive. The landlord was not at home, and the whole domestic management rested on the poor pale wife, who had five children to take care of, and expected a sixth soon. She had for an assistant a single little negro wench, who was soon sent away, so the poor woman had every thing to provide; yet she set before us an excellent supper. Towards morning, I was roused out of my uneasy slumbers by a powerful uproar. It was caused by cranes that flew over the house.

In 1861, a portion of the Mobile & Pensacola Railroad was built through Bell Fontaine with Blakely destined as the initial terminus. However, with the outbreak of the American Civil War, construction was halted around Belle Fontaine. During the Civil War, residents were forced to evacuate by Confederate forces.

Some of the families that have been recorded living in Belle Fontaine have been the Pollards, Halls, Holmans, and Stapletons. In the mid-1800s, Solomon "Sol" Stapleton and Andrew Lewis Holman built and founded a school for the community. Stapleton served as its teacher. The school, known as Belle Fountain School, also acted as the settlement's church at this time.

== Legacy ==
The original settlement no longer exists. Bell Fontaine was gradually replaced by the communities of Hamilton and Gateswood.
