= Dickinson, Alabama =

Unincorporated community in Alabama, United States

- Unincorporated community
- Location within the state of Alabama Dickinson, Alabama (the United States)
- Coordinates: 31°45′46.8″N 87°42′36″W
- Country: United States
- State: Alabama
- County: Clarke
- Time zone: UTC-6 (Central (CST))
  - Summer (DST): UTC-5 (CDT)
- ZIP code: 36436
- Area code: 251

Dickinson is an unincorporated community in Clarke County, Alabama, United States.

== History ==
The community was first settled in the 1880s and is named for a family who moved to the area.

== Notable people ==
- Tom Franklin, crime fiction writer

== Geography ==
Dickinson is located at 31.763°N 87.71°W.
