= Opine, Alabama =

Unincorporated community in Alabama, United States

- Unincorporated community
- Location in Alabama.
- Coordinates: 31°54′18″N 87°56′02″W
- Country: United States
- State: Alabama
- County: Clarke
- Elevation: 157 ft (48 m)
- Time zone: UTC-6 (Central (CST))
  - Summer (DST): UTC-5 (CDT)
- Area code: 251
- GNIS feature ID: 156841

Opine is an unincorporated community in Clarke County, Alabama, United States.

== History ==
The name Opine likely comes from a shortened form of O'pine. A post office operated under the name Opine from 1898 to 1945.
