= Tattlersville, Alabama =

Unincorporated community in Alabama, United States

Tattlersville
- Location within the state of Alabama Tattlersville (the United States)
- Coordinates: 31°42′46″N 88°03′23″W
- Country: United States
- State: Alabama
- County: Clarke
- Time zone: UTC-6 (Central (CST))
  - Summer (DST): UTC-5 (CDT)

Tattlersville is a community in Clarke County, Alabama, United States, located at 31.6293°N 88.0847°W.
