= Monroe Parker =

Evangelist and college president

President of Pillsbury Baptist Bible College
- In office 1957 – 1965
- Preceded by: Office established
- Succeeded by: B. Myron Cedarholm

Personal details
- Born: John Monroe Parker; 23 June 1909 Thomasville, Alabama, US
- Died: 17 July 1994 (aged 85) Decatur, Alabama, US
- Spouses: Harriette Stollenwerck (m. 1934; died 1946); Marjorie Rebecca Parker (m. 1948; died 1981); Ruby Whitley (m. 1983)
- Children: 2

John Monroe "Monk" Parker (June 23, 1909 – July 17, 1994), was a Baptist evangelist, college president, and mission board director.

== Childhood and Education ==
Parker was born in Thomasville, Alabama and was reared in Edgewood and Chillicothe, Texas where his father worked in a dry goods store. Nevertheless, many of his uncles were Baptist ministers.

In 1922 the family moved back to Thomasville, and Parker began working at a soda fountain and delivering newspapers while attending Thomasville High School, where despite his size, he proved a respectable football player.

In 1927, Parker matriculated at Birmingham–Southern College, where he "dropped the pretense of religion," played football, and spent most of the rest of his time "frolicking, drinking, dancing, and running around with a wild gang." After being caught in prank by students at a rival college and having his hair shaved off, a friend nicknamed him "Monk," a name that followed him through his evangelistic career.

Parker was converted in the Methodist church when he was nineteen. The same week he attended a lecture on “The Perils of America” given by Bob Jones, Sr., and in 1928, he transferred to Bob Jones College near Panama City, Florida. Parker became captain and quarterback of the successful, if underchallenged, BJC football team, and he was also elected president of the student body and president of the Student Ministerial Association. At BJC he met Harriette Stollenwerck, a cousin of Jones's wife, and they were married on July 29, 1934.

== Evangelist ==
On March 7, 1929, Parker preached his first sermon (which he had practiced by declaiming to a swamp near the campus) and “ten people came forward to accept Jesus Christ as Saviour.” Bob Jones asked Parker to become a summer evangelist, preach on a new radio station in Anniston, Alabama, and hold promotional meetings for the college. Alternating between hitchhiking and preaching, Parker made enough money that summer to return to college—although his financial situation did not improve much during the Depression. Back at BJC he recalled accidentally poking a hole in his worn-out shoes and "weeping like a child" because he did not have the money to buy new soles.

In 1937, after five years of full-time evangelism, Parker returned to Bob Jones College (which had since moved to Cleveland, Tennessee) to teach and serve as Director of Religious Activities. Eventually he became the assistant to Bob Jones. Meanwhile, he continued to hold evangelistic campaigns.

On December 30, 1946, Parker's wife was killed in an auto accident shortly after she had composed the music for what was to become the Bob Jones University hymn. He married Marjorie Rebecca Parker (no relation), who had been Bob Jones's secretary, on January 5, 1948. They had two children: son, John Jr.; and daughter, Penny.

Parker re-entered full-time evangelism in 1949. In 1954, he hesitantly accepted the pastorate of Grace Baptist Church, Decatur, Alabama, and attendance more than doubled in the three years he served as pastor. In 1957 Parker was elected the first resident president of Pillsbury Baptist Bible College. He fired the entire faculty his first year in office but retained the confidence of the board of directors and served nearly seven years more. Under the leadership of Parker and his successor, Myron Cedarholm, the school grew to over seven hundred students.

Returning once more to evangelism, Parker then was named General Director of Baptist World Mission in 1969, a mission board "in debt and badly organized" when he assumed leadership. Parker had its headquarters moved to Decatur, Alabama, where he had made his home, but he refused to take a salary. On March 14, 1981, Marjorie died. Two years later, he married Ruby, the widow of Ed Whitley who was an acquaintance and longtime board member of Bob Jones University, on January 4, 1983.

Besides conducting hundreds of evangelistic campaigns and preaching in scores of high schools, colleges, Bible institutes and seminaries, Parker taught in Bible colleges and in seminaries, organized an association of Independent Baptist churches in Alabama, served as president of the Minnesota Baptist Convention, and organized the Christian Dells Bible Camp and Conference Grounds near Decatur, Alabama.

== Influence and character ==
Parker served in the first rank of fundamentalist evangelists of the period, and in the struggle between fundamentalists and evangelicals during the 1950s and '60s, Parker took the side of separatists against the ecumenical evangelism of Billy Graham, although he liked Graham personally and had known him since the younger man was seventeen.

Those who met Parker late in life recalled a man who was humble, gracious, and had a great sense of humor. One missionary who had been mentored by Parker called him the "best balance of knowledge and zeal" he had ever encountered. He noted that Parker's Greek New Testament was "worn to a frazzle" and that when he preached on Hell, Parker would first discuss all the Greek and Hebrew words translated "hell" in the Bible before launching into an evangelistic message.
