= Kathryn Tucker Windham Museum =

Biographical museum in Thomasville, Alabama, United States

Coordinates: 31.88915°N 87.74471°W

- Established: 2003
- Location: Thomasville, Alabama.
- Website: Official website

The Kathryn Tucker Windham Museum is a biographical museum located on the campus of Coastal Alabama Community College in Thomasville, Alabama. It is dedicated to preserving the works of native author, storyteller, and journalist Kathryn Tucker Windham. Windham spent much of her life recording Alabama's history and folklore. The museum was dedicated on June 1, 2003, Windham's 85th birthday.

Located in the College's library building, it includes a sculpture of Windham by Alabama folk artist Charlie Lucas.
