= Thomasville Historic District =

Historic district in Alabama, United States

- U.S. National Register of Historic Places
- U.S. Historic district
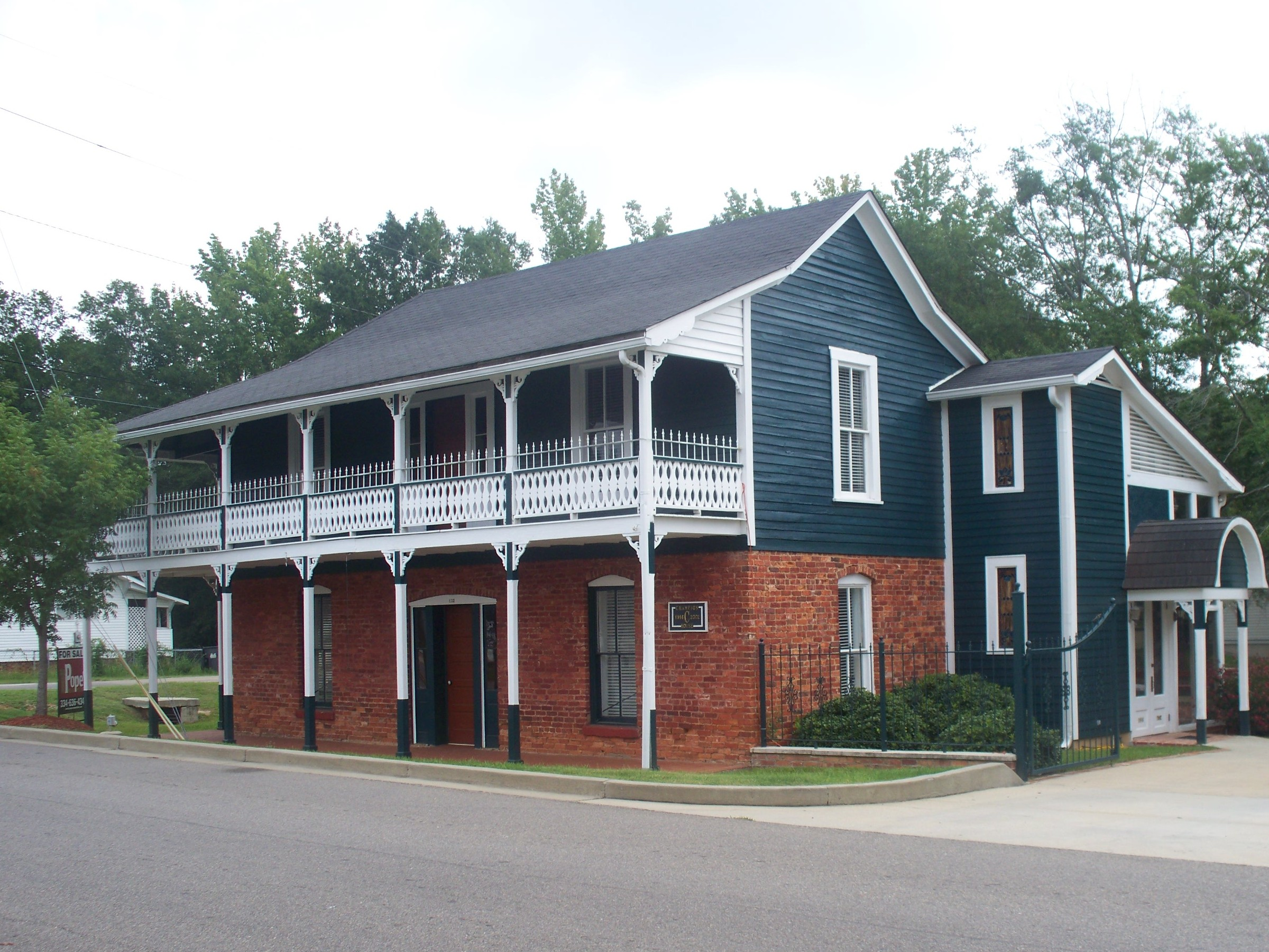
- The Champion House on West Front Street.

- Location within Alabama Location within the United States
- Location: Thomasville, Alabama
- Coordinates: 31°54′46″N 87°44′11″W
- Architectural style: Bungalow/Craftsman, Early Commercial
- MPS: Clarke County MPS
- NRHP reference No.: 99000151
- Added to NRHP: February 12, 1999

The Thomasville Historic District is a historic district in the city of Thomasville, Alabama, United States. Thomasville was founded in 1888, along the then newly constructed railroad between Mobile and Selma. The city's business district suffered a major fire in 1899, with only one brick building surviving. The historic district features examples of early commercial, Queen Anne, Colonial Revival, Craftsman, and regional vernacular architecture. The historic district is centered on the old business district and is roughly bounded by U.S. Highway 43, West Front Street, Wilson Street, and West Third Street. It is a part of the Clarke County Multiple Property Submission and was placed on the National Register of Historic Places on February 12, 1999.
