= Walker Springs, Alabama =

Unincorporated community in Alabama, United States

- Unincorporated community
- Location within the state of Alabama Walker Springs, Alabama (the United States)
- Coordinates: 31.54072°N 87.79111°W
- Country: United States
- State: Alabama
- County: Clarke
- Elevation: 79 ft (24 m)
- Time zone: UTC-6 (Central (CST))
  - Summer (DST): UTC-5 (CDT)
- Area code: 251

Walker Springs is an unincorporated community in Clarke County, Alabama, United States.

== History ==
The community is likely named for William Walker, who settled in the area in the early 1800s. In 1887, village lots for the community were surveyed and sold. By 1920, the community had several stores and two churches.

== Geography ==
Walker Springs is located at 31.54072°N 87.79111°W at an elevation of 79 feet (24 m).
