= Erie, Alabama =

- Ghost town
- Location within Alabama Location within the United States
- Coordinates: 32°43′3.6″N 87°47′50.24″W
- Country: United States
- State: Alabama
- County: Hale
- Elevation: 548 ft (167 m)

Population
  - Total: 0
- Time zone: UTC-6 (Central (CST))
  - Summer (DST): UTC-5 (CDT)
- GNIS feature ID: 138975

Erie is a ghost town located in present-day Hale County, Alabama, United States. This was formerly the county seat of the larger Greene County, but the seat was moved to Eutaw in 1838 for the benefits of a more central location in a developing frontier area.

Erie declined without the benefit of county government business. When Hale County was organized in 1867, after the Civil War, Erie was within its boundaries. It was effectively abandoned long before the last house burned down in 1933.

Located at the "Erie Bend" on the east bank of the Black Warrior River, the former settlement is approximately 11 mi (18 km) east of Greensboro.

== History ==
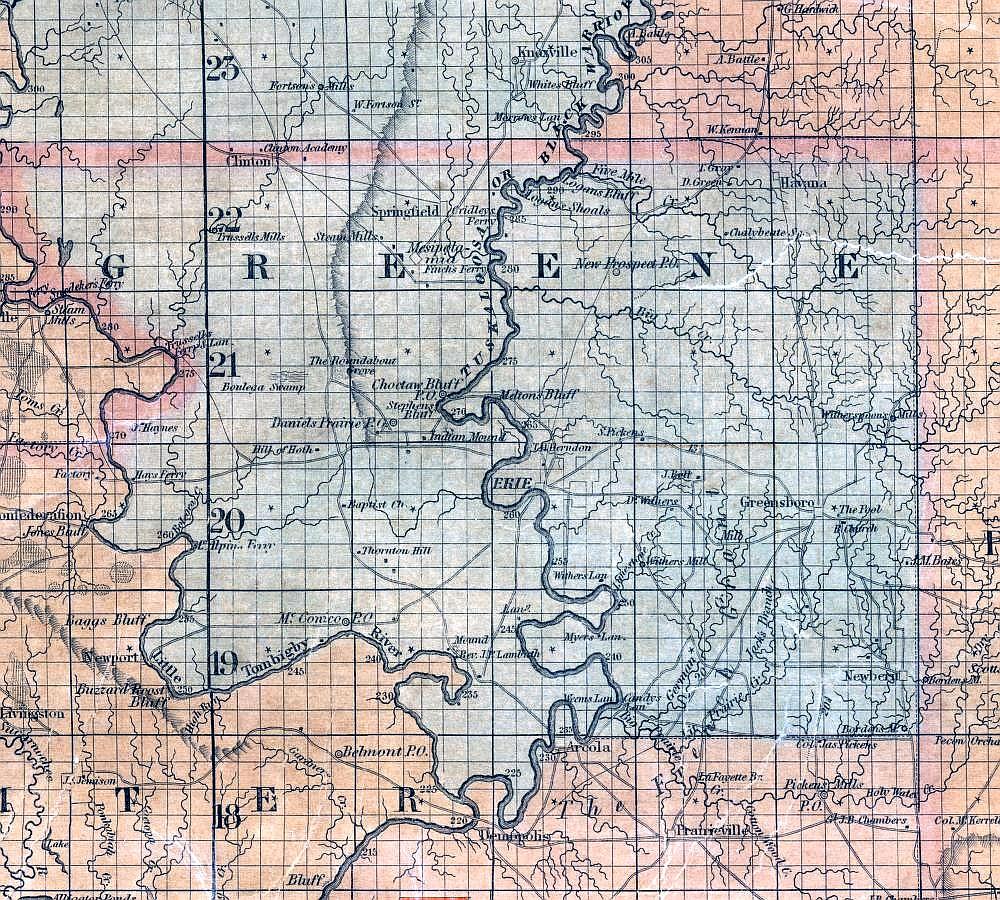
Map from 1837 showing the location in Greene County (now Hale County)

Originally located in Greene County, Erie was the first county seat.

Erie was incorporated in 1820, and was a thriving town with stores, a hotel, a jail, and a population of approximately 1,500 who "dwelt in pomp and circumstances with all the bickerings and intrique (sic), the ambitions, love and hate that surrounds a prosperous town".

Located on a bend of the Black Warrior River, Erie became a shipping port for cotton headed to the seaport of Mobile on the Gulf Coast. The hauling of cotton by wagon gave employment to a number of professional teamsters.

== Decline ==
Several factors led to a decision by the county legislators to move the county seat to Eutaw in 1838. Erie had "little and bad water and a muddy location", and was not centrally located. As population increased in the western part of the county, a more central location was desired. In addition, during the late 1830s, Erie suffered an outbreak of yellow fever, as did many towns on the river system. The settlement also suffered flooding.

The loss of status as county seat caused the decline of the frontier town. Erie was within the territory of what became part Hale County, Alabama when it was organized in 1867, following the Civil War. Erie's decline continued and the last remaining house was destroyed by fire in 1933.

The former settlement is now located on private property, and a few stones and bricks can be found there. The Erie Cemetery is located a short distance east.

== Notable people ==
- Thomas H. Herndon, elected to Alabama House of Representatives and United States House of Representatives.
- Thomas Seay, 27th Governor of Alabama.
