= Waxahatchee Creek =

Tributary of the Coosa River, Alabama, U.S.

Coordinates: 33.022343°N 86.520814°W

Waxahatchee Creek is a 21.7-mile-long (34.9 km) tributary of the lower Coosa River near Shelby, Alabama. It forms the southeastern border between Shelby County and Chilton County, where it is crossed by Alabama State Route 145. The lower reaches of Waxahatchee Creek are broad and popular with water skiers and recreational boaters. Several resort camps and marinas are located on the creek, and anglers have found the submerged forests of the middle to upper creek are favorite spots for largemouth bass. The channel is known for crappie. In the upper creek, the water grows very shallow, but there are "holes" of deep water where bluegill and bream are plentiful.

Waxahatchee Creek is part of the habitat of the threatened round rocksnail, which is included on the United States Fish and Wildlife Service list of endangered species.

Etymologically, Waxahatchee may be derived from the Muscogee words wakse or Waksvlke (a clan name) and hacci or hvcce (stream).

== References in popular culture ==
- Waxahatchee, name of American indie rock music project of singer-songwriter Katie Crutchfield

== See also ==
- List of place names of Native American origin in Alabama
- Waxahachie, a city in Texas with a name possibly derived from Waxahatchee Creek
- Waxahachie Creek, a creek in Texas.
