= Bashi Skirmish =

Battle of the Creek War

Coordinates: 31°55′40″N 88°0′59″W

- Part of the Creek War
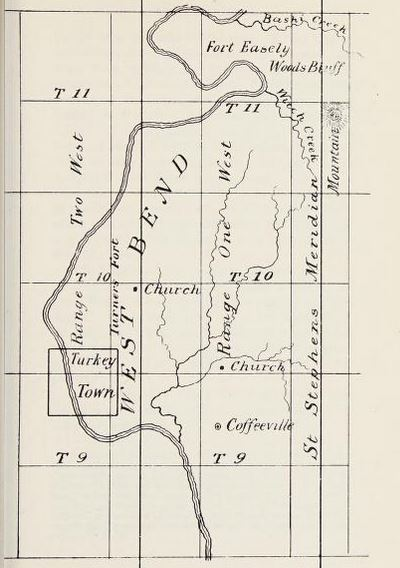
- Approximate location of Bashi Skirmish. Fort Easley (spelled Easely) and Bashi Creek are located at the top of the map.
Date	October 4?, 1813
Location	Failetown, Alabama
Result	Creek victory

Belligerents
Creek	United States

Commanders and leaders
Unknown	Colonel William McGrew †

Strength
Unknown	~25

Casualties and losses
None Documented	~4 killed 1 missing Several wounded

The Bashi Skirmish in the Creek War was fought in what became Failetown, Alabama. A Clarke County historical marker which stands on Woods Bluff Road between Alabama 69 and Cassidy Hill marks the location of the incident which resulted in the death of 4 Americans.

The exact date of this skirmish is not clear but it is believed to have occurred in early October 1813. At least one source puts it at October 4, 1813.

A group of 25 white horsemen led by Colonel William McGrew left St. Stephens traveling towards Fort Easley. The company was proceeding towards a stream called Bashi Creek that flows into the Tombigbee River a mile or two north of Wood's Bluff when they suddenly found themselves among concealed Creek warriors. They were ambushed after a turkey tail was raised above a log by one of the concealed Creek, giving the signal for attack. The Indians who had guns instantly fired from their places of concealment and McGrew who had taken part in the Battle of Burnt Corn was killed along with Edmund Miles, Jesse Griffin and Captain William Bradbury. David Griffin was reported missing and presumed dead; his body was never found.
