= Bashi Creek =

Creek in Alabama, United States

Physical characteristics
- Source
  - location: Bashi, Clarke County
  - coordinates: 31.88848°N 87.78750°W
- Mouth
  - location: Tombigbee River
  - coordinates: 31.95654°N 88.07279°W
  - elevation: 33 ft (10 m)

Bashi Creek, also historically known as Bashai Creek, is a tributary of the Tombigbee River in northern Clarke County in Alabama.

== Location ==
Bashi Creek originates near Bashi, at coordinates of 31.88848°N 87.78750°W, and discharges into the Tombigbee River near Woods Bluff, at coordinates of 31.95654°N 88.07279°W. It is located above the Coffeeville Lock and Dam and is the only inlet off the river for several miles. There is a paved boat ramp located on the creek.

== Etymology ==
The creek first appears on an 1844 map as Bashai Creek. Language scholars believe Bashi to be an adaptation of the Choctaw language word bachaya, meaning "line," "row," or "course".

== Bashi Formation ==
The creek has lent its name to the Bashi Formation, formerly also known as the Woods Bluff Formation, a greensand marl strata dating to the early Eocene. The creek flows through the exposed strata of the formation.

== Bashi Skirmish ==
The Bashi Skirmish in the Creek War was fought near the banks of this creek and took its name from the waterway.
