= Thomasville City Schools (Alabama) =

School district in Alabama, United States

Thomasville City School District is a school district in Clarke County, Alabama.

Thomasville City Schools (TCS) provides a comprehensive education system, accredited by the Alabama State Board of Education and Cognia.

== Asbestos Management in Thomasville City Schools ==
All Thomasville City Schools have undergone inspection by an EPA-approved asbestos inspector and comply with the Asbestos Hazard Emergency Response Act (AHERA) regulations.

== Appointment of Vickie Morris as Superintendent ==
On April 19, Vickie Morris was appointed as the superintendent of Thomasville City Schools by the Thomasville City Board of Education, becoming the first woman to hold the position. Previously serving as the principal of Thomasville Elementary School, Morris has also held roles as principal of Thomasville Middle School and as the district’s director of Curriculum and Instruction, Technology, and Testing.

A graduate of the University of West Alabama, Morris holds bachelor’s and master’s degrees in elementary education, as well as a degree in educational administration. She resides in Thomasville with her husband, Todd, and their daughter, Maryanna, a 2020 graduate of Thomasville High School and current student at Mississippi State University.

== Thomasville City Board of Education ==
=== Current Board Members as of May 31, 2022 ===
Jim Davis - President - term of service 2020-2025

Taylor Williams - Vice President - term of service 2021-2026

Dwight Figgers - term of service 2023-2028

Rita Nichols - term of service 2024-2029

Tiffany Rodgers-Shamburger - term of service 2022-2027
