= Beaver Mills, Alabama =

Beaver Mills
- Ghost town
- Location within Alabama Location within the United States
- Coordinates: 30°58′11″N 88°14′05″W
- Country: United States
- State: Alabama
- County: Mobile
- Elevation: 98 ft (30 m)
- Time zone: UTC-6 (Central (CST))
  - Summer (DST): UTC-5 (CDT)
- Area code: 251
- GNIS ID: 149608

Beaver Mills, also known as Beaver Meadow, is a ghost town in Mobile County, Alabama, United States, near U.S. Route 45, south of Citronelle. It was the site of a paper mill that was also used as a uniform depot during the American Civil War. A post office operated under the name Beaver Meadow from 1890 to 1906.
