= Campbell, Alabama =

Unincorporated community in Alabama, United States

- Unincorporated town
- Location within the state of Alabama Campbell, Alabama (the United States)
- Coordinates: 31°55′35″N 87°58′50″W
- Country: United States
- State: Alabama
- County: Clarke
- Elevation: 95 ft (29 m)
- Time zone: UTC-6 (Central (CST))
  - Summer (DST): UTC-5 (CDT)
- ZIP code: 36727
- Area code: 334

Campbell is an unincorporated community in Clarke County, Alabama, United States.

== History ==
Campbell was settled in the 1800s by pioneers from South Carolina. The community was first called Millersville, in honor of the Miller family. The name was later changed to Campbell after a Dr. Campbell who lived in the area. The community expanded around the intersection of the stagecoach road from Mobile to Demopolis and the road from Choctaw Corner to Woods Bluff. Campbell was once home to five general stores, a cabinet shop, cotton gins, sawmills, and various other shops.

Robert Beverley Jr.'s (c.1667—1722) family moved to Campbell from Wadesboro, North Carolina due to harsh winter climate. They were lineal descendants of John Rolfe and Pocahontas.

== Geography ==
Campbell is located at 31.926389°N 87.980556°W and has an elevation of 95 feet (29 m).

== Notable person ==
- Bill Armistead (b. 1944), chairman of the Alabama Republican Party from 2011 to 2015
