= Sea Warrior Creek =

Stream in Alabama, U.S.

Coordinates: 31°43′51″N 88°07′12″W

Sea Warrior Creek is a stream in the U.S. state of Alabama.

"Sea Warrior" is the result of a name corrupted from the Choctaw language (Isawaya) purported to mean "crouching deer".
