= Bashi, Alabama =

Unincorporated community in Alabama, United States

- Unincorporated community
- Location within the state of Alabama Bashi, Alabama (the United States)
- Coordinates: 31.97126°N 87.86140°W
- Country: United States
- State: Alabama
- County: Clarke
- Elevation: 174 ft (53 m)
- Time zone: UTC-6 (Central (CST))
  - Summer (DST): UTC-5 (CDT)
- ZIP code: 36784
- Area code: 334

Bashi is an unincorporated community in Clarke County, Alabama, United States. It takes its name from the nearby Bashi Creek that flows westward into the Tombigbee River.

== Geography ==
Bashi is located at 31.97126°N 87.86140°W at an elevation of 174 feet (53 m). Bashi is in the Central Time Zone.
