= Thomasville, Alabama =

City in Alabama, United States

- City
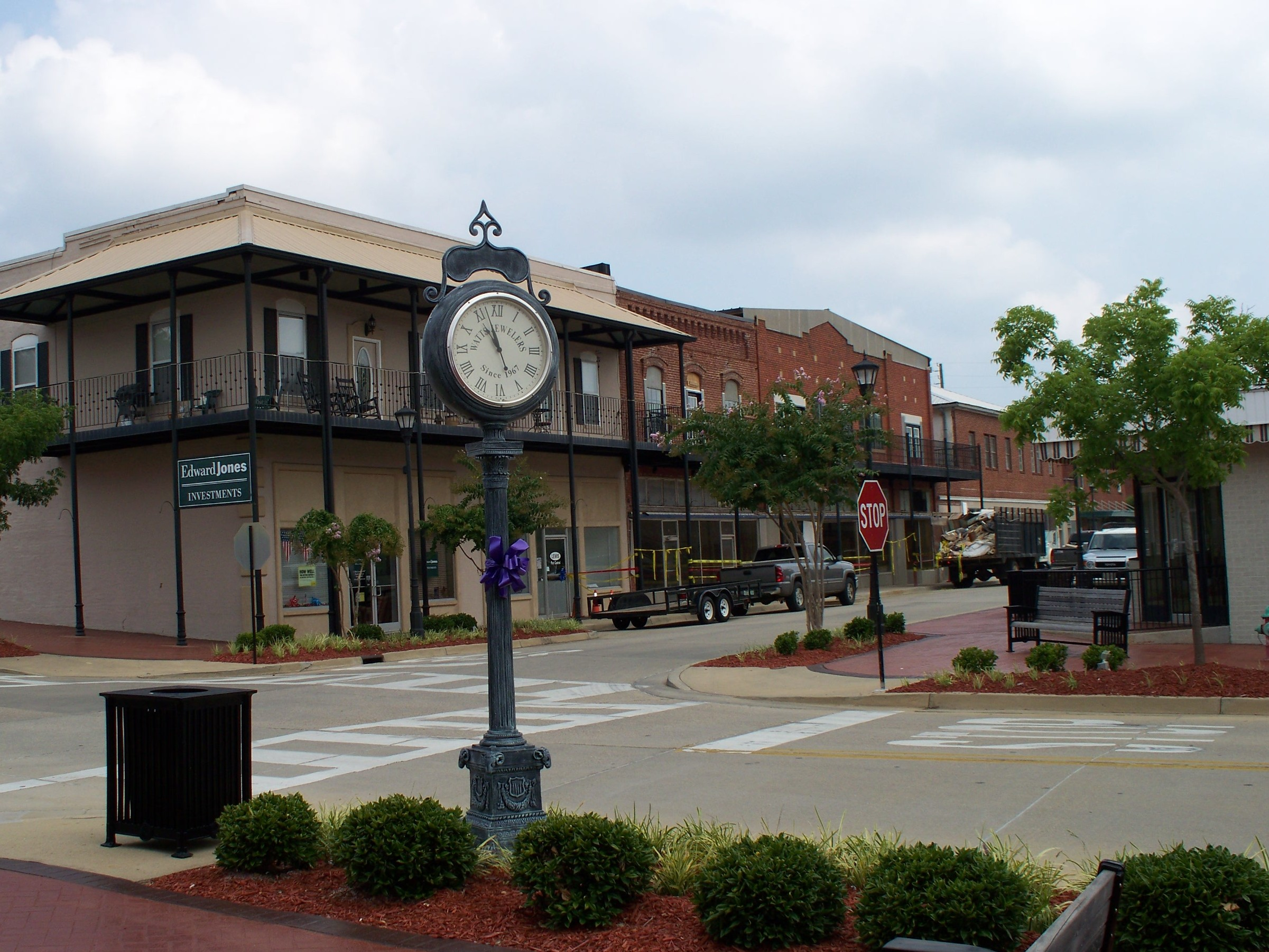
- Downtown Thomasville in 2008.

- Flag Seal
- Nickname: The City of Roses
- Motto: "Southwest Alabama's Success Story"
- Location of Thomasville in Clarke County, Alabama.
- Coordinates: 31°54′20″N 87°44′50″W
- Country: United States
- State: Alabama
- County: Clarke
- Founded: 1888

Area
  - Total: 8.73 sq mi (22.62 km^{2})
  - Land: 8.73 sq mi (22.61 km^{2})
  - Water: 0 sq mi (0.00 km^{2})
- Elevation: 423 ft (129 m)

Population (2020)
  - Total: 3,649
  - Density: 417.9/sq mi (161.37/km^{2})
- Time zone: UTC-6 (Central (CST))
  - Summer (DST): UTC-5 (CDT)
- ZIP codes: 36762, 36784
- Area code: 334
- FIPS code: 01-75960
- GNIS feature ID: 2405583
- Website: City of Thomasville

Thomasville is a city in Clarke County, Alabama, United States. At the 2020 census, the population was 3,649. Founded as a late 19th-century railroad town, it has transitioned over the course of more than a century into a 21st-century commercial hub. It is the childhood hometown of author and storyteller Kathryn Tucker Windham.

== History ==
Thomasville was founded in 1888 and incorporated on November 24 of that year. The former community of Choctaw Corner, dating back to the antebellum period, was a settlement west of what would become Thomasville, but when the merchants there learned that a railroad was going to bypass their town to the east, they decided to move their stores to be near the railroad. The former community is now inside the city limits. The tracks between Mobile and Selma were completed the same year that Thomasville began. First referred to as "Choctaw", the town was named after railroad financier and former Union Civil War general, Samuel Russell Thomas, after he donated $500 for the construction of Thomasville's first school. The town had expanded by the end of the 19th century with numerous stores, several hotels and boarding houses, and a depot station. In 1899, what is now downtown was destroyed by a fire that burned several blocks of the wood-frame buildings. Thomasville quickly rebuilt, this time in brick, and was once again flourishing by the start of World War I.

Over the next century, Thomasville continued to grow and expand. Over the years, many businesses came and others left. These included garment factories, sawmills, and cotton gins. The railroad discontinued its use of the town's depot by the 1950s, but that time also saw the opening of Thomasville's FPS-35 radar base, part of the Air Defense Command's Semi Automatic Ground Environment (SAGE) system, bringing in servicemen and their families. The prototype for the FPS-35 radar was developed at the Thomasville Aircraft Control and Warning Station. The 1950s also saw the planting of roses along Highway 43, the main highway through Thomasville, earning it the nickname of The City of Roses. The 1960s and 1970s saw the opening of numerous paper mills in the area, an industry that continues to be important to the economy of Thomasville today. This time also saw businesses begin to relocate from downtown to the main highway. The Thomasville Historic District was designated in 1999 by the National Register of Historic Places.

== Geography ==
Thomasville is the northernmost incorporated settlement in Clarke County and is situated on an elevated area between the Tombigbee and Alabama rivers. The elevation is 381 feet (116 m). The terrain is gently rolling hills, covered primarily in pine forest. According to the U.S. Census Bureau, the city has a total area of 8.8 square miles (23 km^{2}), all land.

=== Climate ===
The climate in this area is characterized by hot, humid summers and generally mild to cool winters. According to the Köppen Climate Classification system, Thomasville has a humid subtropical climate, abbreviated "Cfa" on climate maps.

Climate data for Thomasville, Alabama, 1991–2020 normals, extremes 1891–present
Month	Jan	Feb	Mar	Apr	May	Jun	Jul	Aug	Sep	Oct	Nov	Dec	Year
Record high °F (°C)	86 (30)	86 (30)	97 (36)	94 (34)	102 (39)	108 (42)	107 (42)	105 (41)	109 (43)	100 (38)	91 (33)	90 (32)	109 (43)
Mean maximum °F (°C)	74.7 (23.7)	77.3 (25.2)	83.1 (28.4)	86.1 (30.1)	91.5 (33.1)	94.8 (34.9)	96.0 (35.6)	96.3 (35.7)	93.9 (34.4)	88.9 (31.6)	80.8 (27.1)	75.8 (24.3)	97.5 (36.4)
Mean daily maximum °F (°C)	58.8 (14.9)	63.1 (17.3)	70.8 (21.6)	77.5 (25.3)	84.9 (29.4)	89.6 (32.0)	91.6 (33.1)	91.8 (33.2)	88.1 (31.2)	79.0 (26.1)	68.5 (20.3)	60.6 (15.9)	77.0 (25.0)
Daily mean °F (°C)	47.9 (8.8)	51.7 (10.9)	58.7 (14.8)	65.3 (18.5)	73.3 (22.9)	79.3 (26.3)	81.5 (27.5)	81.2 (27.3)	77.0 (25.0)	66.9 (19.4)	56.7 (13.7)	49.9 (9.9)	65.8 (18.8)
Mean daily minimum °F (°C)	37.0 (2.8)	40.3 (4.6)	46.7 (8.2)	53.0 (11.7)	61.8 (16.6)	68.9 (20.5)	71.5 (21.9)	70.7 (21.5)	65.9 (18.8)	54.8 (12.7)	45.0 (7.2)	39.1 (3.9)	54.6 (12.5)
Mean minimum °F (°C)	19.1 (−7.2)	23.3 (−4.8)	28.6 (−1.9)	36.5 (2.5)	47.2 (8.4)	59.6 (15.3)	65.6 (18.7)	63.3 (17.4)	53.3 (11.8)	37.9 (3.3)	27.6 (−2.4)	23.7 (−4.6)	17.1 (−8.3)
Record low °F (°C)	−1 (−18)	−5 (−21)	14 (−10)	27 (−3)	36 (2)	46 (8)	54 (12)	51 (11)	35 (2)	26 (−3)	14 (−10)	3 (−16)	−5 (−21)
Average precipitation inches (mm)	5.48 (139)	4.63 (118)	5.65 (144)	4.01 (102)	4.05 (103)	4.60 (117)	6.00 (152)	4.83 (123)	4.27 (108)	3.96 (101)	4.75 (121)	5.26 (134)	57.49 (1,462)
Average snowfall inches (cm)	0.0 (0.0)	0.0 (0.0)	0.0 (0.0)	0.0 (0.0)	0.0 (0.0)	0.0 (0.0)	0.0 (0.0)	0.0 (0.0)	0.0 (0.0)	0.0 (0.0)	0.0 (0.0)	0.1 (0.25)	0.1 (0.25)
Average precipitation days (≥ 0.01 in)	10.6	9.2	8.7	7.6	8.1	9.9	12.1	10.2	8.3	6.8	8.3	9.8	109.6
Average snowy days (≥ 0.1 in)	0.0	0.0	0.0	0.0	0.0	0.0	0.0	0.0	0.0	0.0	0.0	0.0	0.0
Source 1: NOAA
Source 2: NWS/XMACIS2

== Demographics ==
Historical population
Census	Pop.	Note	%±
1890	291		—
1900	686		135.7%
1910	1,181		72.2%
1920	1,002		−15.2%
1930	1,504		50.1%
1940	2,000		33.0%
1950	2,425		21.3%
1960	3,182		31.2%
1970	3,769		18.4%
1980	4,387		16.4%
1990	4,301		−2.0%
2000	4,649		8.1%
2010	4,209		−9.5%
2020	3,649		−13.3%
U.S. Decennial Census; 2013 Estimate

=== 2020 census ===
Thomasville Racial Composition
Race	Num.	Perc.
White	1,582	43.35%
Black or African American	1,937	53.08%
Native American	5	0.14%
Asian	15	0.41%
Other/Mixed	78	2.14%
Hispanic or Latino	32	0.88%

As of the 2020 census, Thomasville had a population of 3,649. The median age was 43.0 years. 21.5% of residents were under the age of 18 and 22.3% of residents were 65 years of age or older. For every 100 females there were 81.1 males, and for every 100 females age 18 and over there were 75.5 males age 18 and over.

0.0% of residents lived in urban areas, while 100.0% lived in rural areas.

There were 1,520 households in Thomasville, of which 31.1% had children under the age of 18 living in them. Of all households, 36.9% were married-couple households, 18.3% were households with a male householder and no spouse or partner present, and 40.2% were households with a female householder and no spouse or partner present. About 33.2% of all households were made up of individuals and 15.2% had someone living alone who was 65 years of age or older. The city had 792 families.

There were 1,836 housing units, of which 17.2% were vacant. The homeowner vacancy rate was 1.6% and the rental vacancy rate was 11.2%.

=== 2010 census ===
As of the census of 2010, there were 4,209 people, 1,737 households, and 1,128 families residing in the city. There were 1,983 housing units. The racial makeup of the city was 51.7% Black or African American, 47.2% White, 0.4% Native American, 0.8% Asian, and 0.5% from other races. 1.3% of the population were Hispanic or Latino of any race.

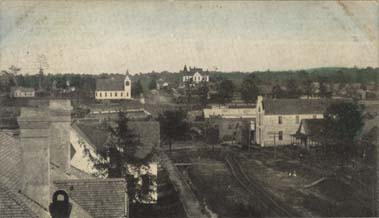
Thomasville before the fire of 1899, looking east down Wilson Avenue.

There were 1,737 households, out of which 30.1% had children under the age of 18 living with them, 38.1% were married couples living together, 22.5% had a female householder with no husband present, and 35.1% were non-families. 32.4% of all households were made up of individuals, and 12.6% had someone living alone who was 65 years of age or older. The average household size was 2.38 and the average family size was 3.00.

In the city, the population was spread out, with 29% under the age of 20, 45.3% from 20 to 64, and 16.3% who were 65 years of age or older. The median age was 38.4 years.

== Economy ==
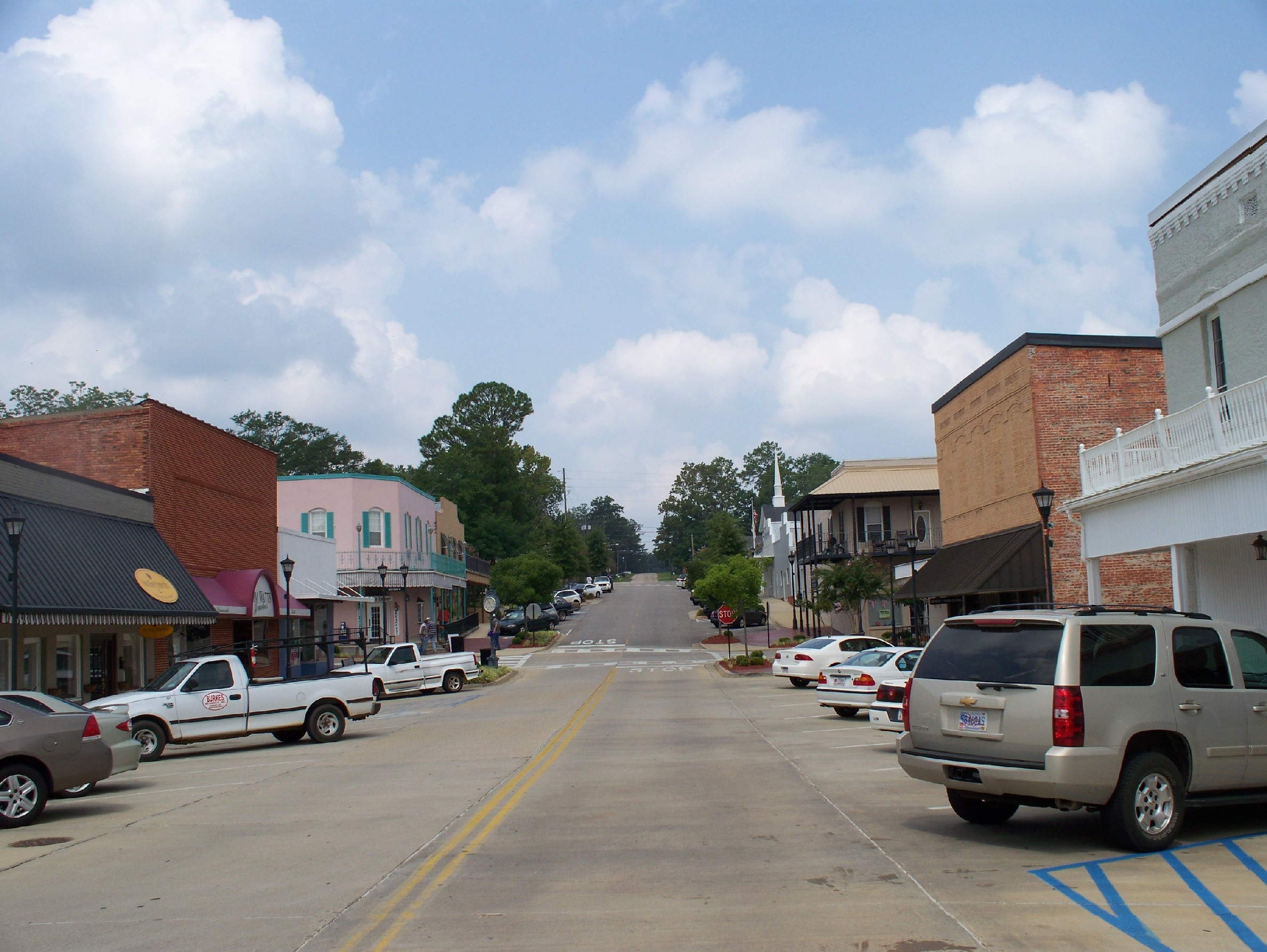
Downtown Thomasville in 2008, looking west up Wilson Avenue.

The economy of Thomasville is largely based on retail trade and the service sector, with the city serving as a regional commercial hub. Its trade area is much larger than is indicated by its small population.

In 2000, the U.S., Census Bureau recorded that 58.5% of the population was in the work force with 20.6% of families and 23.5% of the population living below the poverty line, including 31.9% of those under age 18 and 25.2% of those age 65 or over. The median income for a household in the city was $26,549, and the median income for a family was $32,476. Males had a median income of $32,212 versus $21,319 for females. The per capita income for the city was $14,916.

== Education ==
Thomasville has its own public school system, the Thomasville City Schools, that includes Thomasville Elementary with an enrollment of 676 students, Thomasville Middle with 535, and Thomasville High with 448.

Thomasville Elementary School is one of three schools that make up the Thomasville City School System. It is located at 300 Quincy Ingram Street in Thomasville, Alabama. TES was established in its current location in 1988. The gymnasium and lower wing were added in 1990. Then in 1997, the kindergarten wing was added. Thomasville Elementary teaches Pre-K through fourth grade. It serves approximately 500 students on a daily basis. There are currently three pre-k classes, four kindergarten classes, five first grade classrooms, four second grade classes, five third grade classes, and four fourth grade classrooms. It has fifty four faculty/staff to best meet the needs of our students. Thomasville City Schools meet 100% of Alabama's accountability goals in all three schools.

Thomasville is also home to a campus of Coastal Alabama Community College. Coastal Alabama Community College is a state-supported, fully accredited, comprehensive two-year college serving southwest Alabama with its main campus in Atmore, The academy at the Fairhope Airport, Bay Minette, Brewton, Fairhope, Gilbertown, Gulf Shores, Jackson, Life Tech Center, Monroeville and Thomasville.

== Healthcare ==
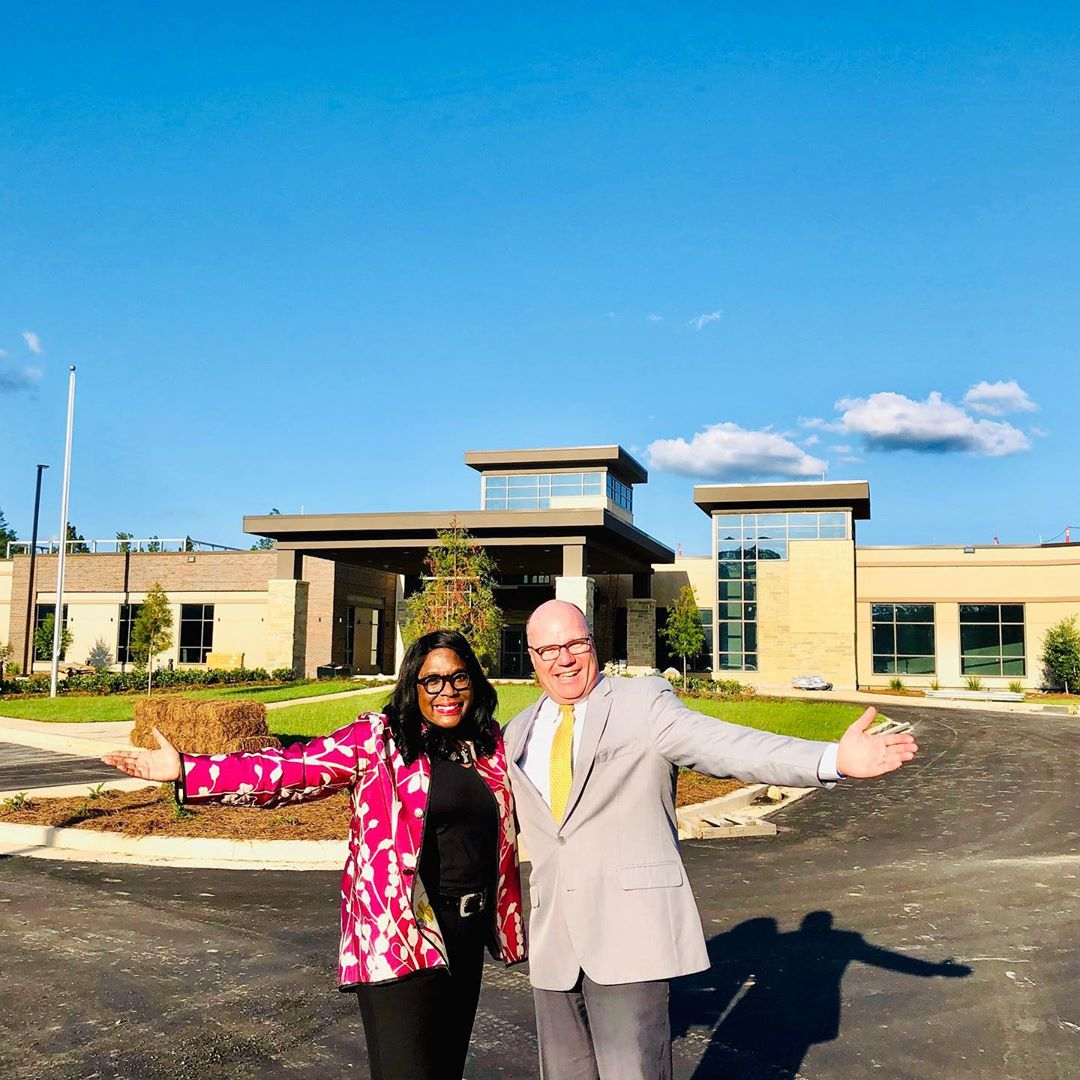
Congresswoman Terri Sewell with Thomasville Mayor Sheldon Day at the new Thomasville Regional Medical Center

Thomasville had one acute care hospital, Southwest Alabama Medical Center, with 50 licensed beds. In 2009 the hospital's owner, Anne Thompson, and city leaders announced plans for a new hospital facility near Thomasville's South Industrial Park, the first new rural hospital in Alabama in 30 years. The new facility was projected to cost $35 million and employ roughly 200 people. However, the facility permanently closed its doors on August 16, 2011. Despite generating revenues in excess of $24.3 million for the year ending in March 2010, the facility lost more than half of a million dollars during the same period. A statement released to the public after closing stated that the hospital had not made enough money to cover operating expenses. The director of the Alabama Department of Public Health confirmed that the facility had turned in its operating license on August 16. In 2020, it was announced that due to the presence of asbestos, the old hospital building would be demolished and the old property redeveloped.

Thomasville Nursing Home is a 70 bed long-term care facility located on Mosley Drive.

A new 68,300 square foot, 29-bed acute care hospital, Thomasville Regional Medical Center, opened on March 3, 2020.

Even though partially owned by the city it closed a few years later due to lack of profitability.

== Media ==
=== Print ===
Thomasville is home to one newspaper, the Thomasville Times. It was established in 1921. The Thomasville News, established in 1996, ceased publication in 2006 when it merged with the Democrat-Reporter, based in Linden.

=== Radio ===
Thomasville has two licensed FM radio stations, WDLG and WJDB-FM.

== Museums and libraries ==
The Thomasville campus of Alabama Southern Community College is home to the Kathryn Tucker Windham Museum. The Thomasville Public Library has an annual operating budget of $88,761 and has a collection of 15,206 books, 455 audio materials, 418 video materials, and 33 serial subscriptions.

== Notable people ==
- Eric Campbell, professional basketball player
- Reid Cornelius, former Major League Baseball player
- Ivy Griffin, former Major League Baseball player
- Anthony Madison, former National Football League player
- Leon C. Megginson, business professor noted for his clarifying statements about Darwinism
- Monroe Parker, Baptist evangelist, college president, and mission board director
- Kathryn Tucker Windham, famous storyteller and author
