= Quilby Creek =

Stream in the U.S. state of Alabama

Coordinates: 32°45′43″N 88°21′39″W

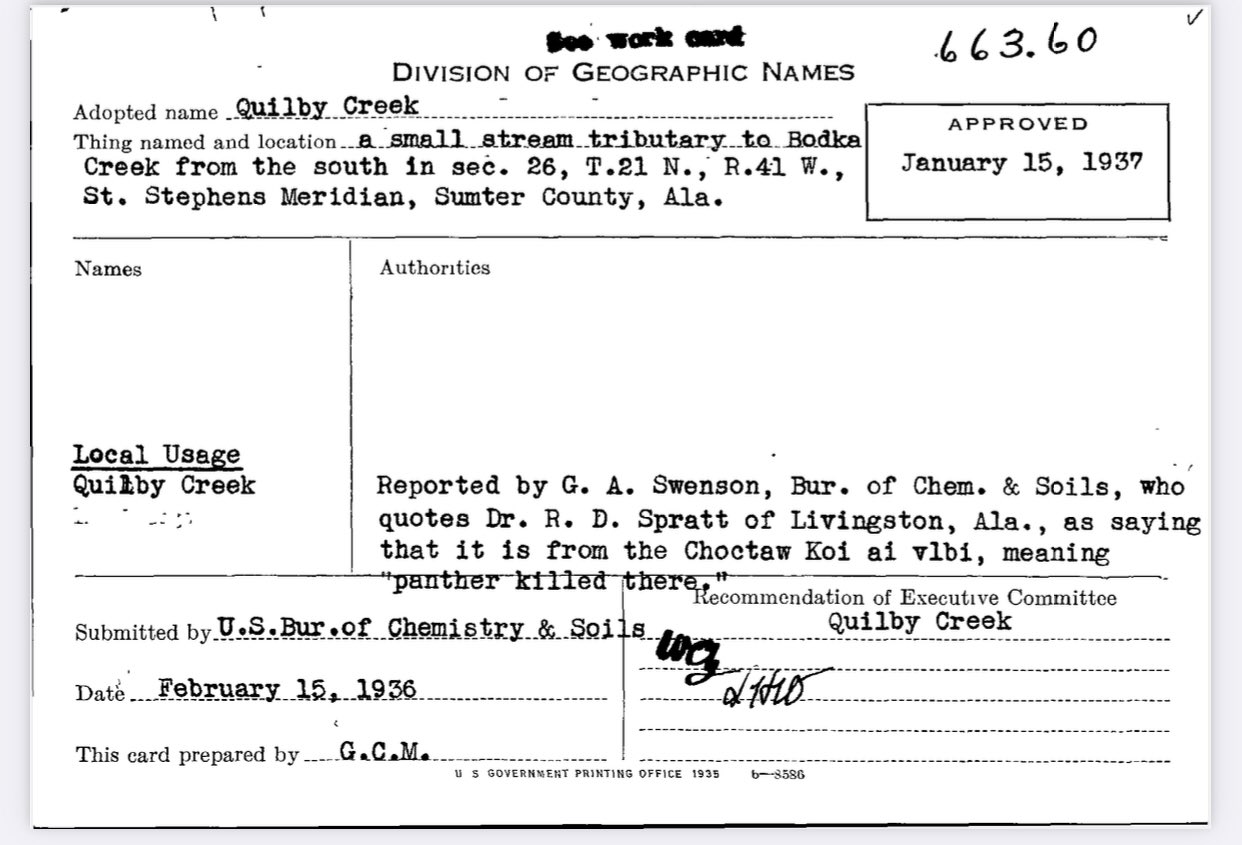
Federal Geographic Names Registry card for Quilby Creek, indicating the Choctaw origin of its name.

Quilby Creek is a headwater of the Mobile River, whose source is in the U.S. state of Mississippi. The creek flows Northeast for around 4 miles (6.4 km), crossing the border into Sumter County, Alabama for the last third of its length, after which it empties into Bodka Creek.

Quilby is thought to be an Anglicization of the Choctaw koi ai ʋlbi. There is room for ambiguity in a translation, which could be "place where the lion was killed" or "place where the lion was trapped". The Alabama historian Robert D. Spratt reported the creek's name using the Choctaw word ʋlbi, which has several meanings centering on the nouns "trap" or "snare". The intended or original word was possibly ʋbi, the transitive verb "to kill". This distinction may be accidental or might specify the manner of the mountain lion's death. Variant names are "Koilbah Creek", "Quibby Creek", and "Quillibee Creek".
