= Beaver Mill =

- U.S. National Register of Historic Places
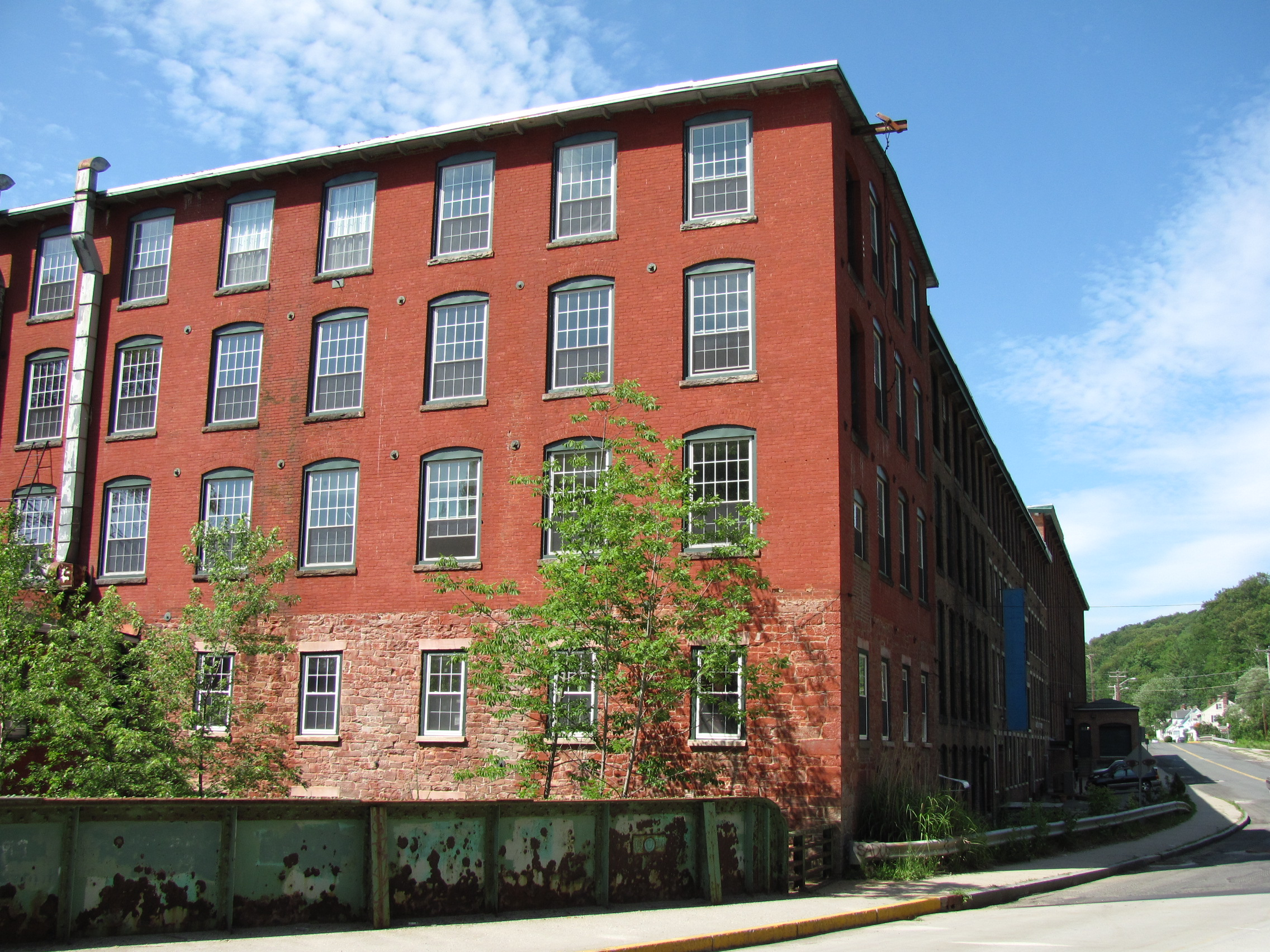
- (2010)

- Location within Massachusetts Location within the United States
- Location: 189 Beaver Street, North Adams, Massachusetts
- Coordinates: 42°42′12″N 73°5′55″W
- Built: 1833
- NRHP reference No.: 73000292
- Added to NRHP: May 11, 1973

Beaver Mill is a historic mill located in North Adams, Massachusetts. With a construction history dating to 1833, it is the oldest surviving mill building in the city, and was the first local acquisition of Sprague Electric, a major local employer in the 20th century. The mill was listed on the National Register of Historic Places in 1973. The complex now houses artist studios and other facilities.

== Description and history ==
Beaver Mill is located east of downtown North Adams, on the north bank of the North Branch Hoosic River, originally the source of its power. It consists of a series of large attached masonry structures, built mainly out of brick. Its main building (mill #1) is built in part on foundations that date to 1833, and its lower floors were built in 1850 out of stone following a fire. This portion is the oldest mill building in North Adams, and its only surviving stone mill structure. The mill was owned for many years by A.C. Houghton, one of the city's leading businessman and its first mayor. In 1875, Gallup & Houghton owned the majority of the mill, with about one quarter owned by Harvey Arnold. A 1,000-foot (300 m) long, 12-foot (3.7 m) high, 4-foot (1.2 m) thick wall was built along the water in 1888 to protect the mill.

The mill achieved its largest extent in 1900, with 25,000 spindles, as part of the Arnold Print Works properties; business failures in 1878 and 1908 caused the mill to be part of the Arnold Print Works Reorganization Agreements. In 1929 Arnold sold the property to Sprague Electric, whose first major facility it was. Sprague moved some of its facilities from Quincy, Massachusetts, to the Beaver Mill in 1930. Sprague went on to take over most of the Arnold complex. Sprague sold it to Hoosuck Community Resources Corp. by 1977.

== See also ==
- National Register of Historic Places listings in Berkshire County, Massachusetts
