= Salitpa, Alabama =

Unincorporated community in Alabama, United States

Salitpa
- Unincorporated community
- Location in Alabama.
- Coordinates: 31°37′47″N 88°01′12″W
- Country: United States
- State: Alabama
- County: Clarke
- Elevation: 180 ft (55 m)
- Time zone: UTC-6 (Central (CST))
  - Summer (DST): UTC-5 (CDT)
- Area code: 251
- GNIS feature ID: 153303

Salitpa is an unincorporated community in Clarke County, Alabama. It has also been known as River Hill.

== History ==
The community was initially located three miles from its current location. In the 1800s, it moved to its current location. It was once home to two sawmills, two cotton gins, two grist mills, two churches, and a school.

A post office called Salitpa has been in operation since 1855. The community took its name from nearby Satilpa Creek. An error in writing the name (crossing the L instead of the T) when applying for a post office resulted in the name being changed.

== Notable person ==
Salitpa was the home of Ray Prim, a minor league baseball star in the Pacific Coast League with the Los Angeles Angels from 1936 to 1942, again in 1944 and in 1947.

== See also ==
- List of geographic names derived from anagrams and ananyms
