= Clarkesville, Alabama =

Clarkesville
- Ghost town
- Location within the state of Alabama
- Coordinates: 31.72819°N 87.87741°W
- Country: United States
- State: Alabama
- County: Clarke
- Time zone: UTC-6 (Central (CST))
  - Summer (DST): UTC-5 (CDT)

Clarkesville (also spelled Clarksville) is a ghost town in Clarke County, Alabama, United States. It was the county seat of Clarke County until 1831.

== History ==
The Alabama legislature appointed a group of county commissioners on 13 December 1819 to select a site for Clarke County's "seat of justice." The legislature made the provision that the site had to be within 3 miles (4.8 km) of the center of county. The commissioners founded Clarkesville as a result. It remained the county seat until 1831, when growing dissatisfaction within the county caused the relocation of the seat to Macon, later renamed Grove Hill. The town had vanished from maps by the late 19th century. A small modern community, roughly a mile from the old site, presently calls itself Clarksville.
