= Tallahatta Springs, Alabama =

Unincorporated community in Alabama, United States

- Unincorporated community
- Location within the state of Alabama Tallahatta Springs, Alabama (the United States)
- Coordinates: 31.90960°N 87.87667°W
- Country: United States
- State: Alabama
- County: Clarke
- Elevation: 200 ft (61 m)
- Time zone: UTC-6 (Central (CST))
  - Summer (DST): UTC-5 (CDT)
- ZIP code: 36784
- Area code: 334

Tallahatta Springs, once called Lowder Springs, is an unincorporated community in Clarke County, Alabama, United States.

== History ==
The community was once home to a cotton gin, saw mill, grist mill, and several general stores. The Scotch Lumber Company operated a lumber camp near Tallahatta Springs in the 1920s that including a physician and company store.

It was once known for its sulfur springs at the headwaters of Tallahatta Creek. A health resort was established here in the middle of the 19th century. Language scholars believe Tallahatta to be an adaptation of two Choctaw language words: tali (rock) and hata (silver/white), literally "white rock."

== Geography ==
Tallahatta Springs is located at 31.90960°N 87.87667°W at an elevation of 200 feet (61 m).
