= Clarke County, Alabama =

County in Alabama, United States

- County
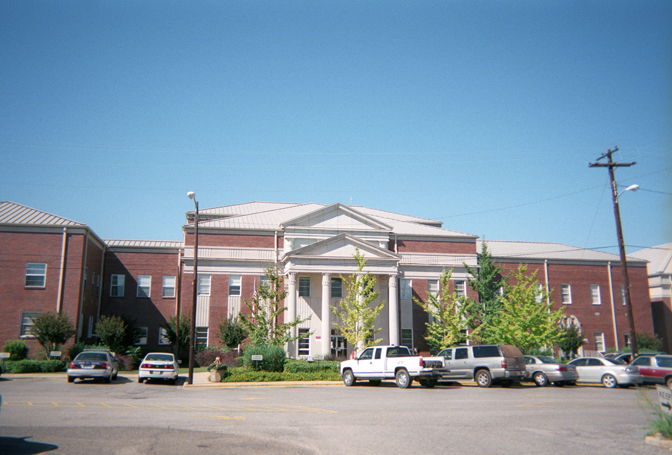
- Clarke County Courthouse in Grove Hill

- Seal

- Location within the U.S. state of Alabama
- Coordinates: 31°40′25″N 87°50′17″W
- Country: United States
- State: Alabama
- Founded: December 10, 1812
- Named for: John Clarke
- Seat: Grove Hill
- Largest city: Jackson

Area
  - Total: 1,253 sq mi (3,250 km^{2})
  - Land: 1,238 sq mi (3,210 km^{2})
  - Water: 14 sq mi (36 km^{2}) 1.1%

Population (2020)
  - Total: 23,087
  - Estimate (2025): 22,014 ▼
  - Density: 18.65/sq mi (7.200/km^{2})
- Time zone: UTC−6 (Central)
  - Summer (DST): UTC−5 (CDT)
- Congressional districts: 2nd, 7th
- Website: www.clarkecountyal.com
- County Number 16 on Alabama Licence Plates

Clarke County is a county located in the southwestern part of the U.S. state of Alabama. As of the 2020 census, the population was 23,087. The county seat is Grove Hill. The county's largest city is Jackson. The county was created by the legislature of the Mississippi Territory in 1812. It is named in honor of General John Clarke of Georgia, who was later elected governor of that state.

The county museum is housed in the Alston-Cobb House in Grove Hill.

== History ==
=== Pre-European era ===
For thousands of years, this area was occupied along the rivers by varying cultures of indigenous peoples. At the time of European encounter, Clarke County was the traditional home of the Choctaw and the Creek people. They traded with the French, who had settlements in Mobile and New Orleans. They also were reached by some English and Scots traders from the British colonies along the Atlantic Coast. After the Louisiana Purchase, they started to establish relations with the United States.

In 1805, by the Treaty of Mount Dexter, the Choctaw conveyed large amounts of land in what is now southeastern Mississippi and southwestern Alabama, including much of the western portion of Clarke County, to the United States for settlement by European Americans.

=== Modern era ===
Clarke County was established on December 10, 1812, by the Mississippi Territory. The county had numerous forts, built by settlers for protection during the Creek War (1813–1814). Some of these forts included: Fort Carney, Fort Easley, Fort Glass, Fort Landrum, Fort Madison, Fort Sinquefield, Turner's Fort, and Fort White. The first county seat was Clarkesville, founded in 1820. The seat was moved to Macon, later renamed Grove Hill, in 1831.

In 1883, the U.S. Supreme Court upheld the conviction of Tony Pace and Mary Cox for interracial dating, in Pace v. Alabama. That precedent was subsequently overturned. In 1892, Clarke County was the scene of a violent confrontation around economic divides that later became known as the Mitcham War.

=== Alcohol prohibition ===
Following the national repeal of prohibition in 1933, Clarke County voted to become a dry county in 1937, when wet-dry counties were established in Alabama.

In the first decade of the 21st century, the county's largest communities voted to legalize alcohol sales: Jackson on May 10, 2005; Thomasville on August 14, 2007; and Grove Hill on November 3, 2009.

=== Salt production ===
Clarke County is home to numerous salt springs. These springs have been used as a source for salt as early as the Mississippian period in 1100 AD. During the Civil War, the county was notable for its salt production due to the naval blockade of southern ports. The Commissioner's Court of Clarke County appropriated $1500 in 1862 for the manufacturing of salt at the salt springs and the State of Alabama operated multiple salt works during the Civil War. These salt works had housing for workers, hospitals, and cemeteries and the salt was produced for military and civilian use. Forts were built at Oven Bluff (Fort Sidney Johnston) and Carney Bluff (Fort Gullett) to protect the salt works and the approach up the Tombigbee River while an additional fort was built at Choctaw Bluff (Fort Stonewall) to protect any advance up the Alabama River.

== Geography ==
According to the United States Census Bureau, the county has a total area of 1,253 square miles (3,250 km^{2}), of which 1,238 square miles (3,210 km^{2}) is land and 14 square miles (36 km^{2}) (or 1.1%) is water. It is the third-largest county in Alabama by land area and the fourth-largest by total area.

=== Major highways ===
- U.S. Highway 43 / State Route 13 (unsigned)
- U.S. Highway 84 / State Route 12 (unsigned)
- State Route 5
- State Route 69
- State Route 154
- State Route 177
- State Route 178
- State Route 295

=== Adjacent counties ===
- Marengo County (north)
- Wilcox County (northeast)
- Monroe County (east)
- Baldwin County (south)
- Washington County (southwest)
- Choctaw County (northwest)

== Demographics ==
Historical population
Census	Pop.	Note	%±
1820	5,839		—
1830	7,595		30.1%
1840	8,640		13.8%
1850	9,786		13.3%
1860	15,049		53.8%
1870	14,663		−2.6%
1880	17,806		21.4%
1890	22,624		27.1%
1900	27,790		22.8%
1910	30,987		11.5%
1920	26,409		−14.8%
1930	26,016		−1.5%
1940	27,636		6.2%
1950	26,548		−3.9%
1960	25,738		−3.1%
1970	26,724		3.8%
1980	27,702		3.7%
1990	27,240		−1.7%
2000	27,867		2.3%
2010	25,833		−7.3%
2020	23,087		−10.6%
2025 (est.)	22,014	▼	−4.6%
U.S. Decennial Census; 1790–1960 1900–1990; 1990–2000 2010–2020

=== Racial and ethnic composition ===
Clarke County, Alabama – Racial and ethnic composition Note: the US Census treats Hispanic/Latino as an ethnic category. This table excludes Latinos from the racial categories and assigns them to a separate category. Hispanics/Latinos may be of any race.
Race / Ethnicity (NH = Non-Hispanic)	Pop 2000	Pop 2010	Pop 2020	% 2000	% 2010	% 2020
White alone (NH)	15,519	13,943	11,970	55.69%	53.97%	51.85%
Black or African American alone (NH)	11,918	11,280	10,223	42.77%	43.67%	44.28%
Native American or Alaska Native alone (NH)	61	96	74	0.22%	0.37%	0.32%
Asian alone (NH)	45	74	91	0.16%	0.29%	0.39%
Pacific Islander alone (NH)	1	4	1	0.00%	0.02%	0.00%
Other race alone (NH)	10	9	37	0.04%	0.03%	0.16%
Mixed race or Multiracial (NH)	133	156	485	0.48%	0.60%	2.10%
Hispanic or Latino (any race)	180	271	206	0.65%	1.05%	0.89%
Total	27,867	25,833	23,087	100.00%	100.00%	100.00%

=== 2020 census ===
As of the 2020 census, the county had a population of 23,087. The median age was 44.3 years. 21.0% of residents were under the age of 18 and 20.9% of residents were 65 years of age or older. For every 100 females there were 90.0 males, and for every 100 females age 18 and over there were 85.9 males age 18 and over.

The racial makeup of the county was 52.1% White, 44.4% Black or African American, 0.3% American Indian and Alaska Native, 0.4% Asian, 0.0% Native Hawaiian and Pacific Islander, 0.4% from some other race, and 2.4% from two or more races. Hispanic or Latino residents of any race comprised 0.9% of the population.

0.0% of residents lived in urban areas, while 100.0% lived in rural areas.

There were 9,662 households in the county, of which 28.8% had children under the age of 18 living with them and 34.0% had a female householder with no spouse or partner present. About 31.3% of all households were made up of individuals and 13.8% had someone living alone who was 65 years of age or older.

There were 11,655 housing units, of which 17.1% were vacant. Among occupied housing units, 75.8% were owner-occupied and 24.2% were renter-occupied. The homeowner vacancy rate was 1.4% and the rental vacancy rate was 8.9%.

=== 2010 ===
According to the 2010 United States census:

- 54.5% White
- 43.9% Black
- 0.4% Native American
- 0.3% Asian
- 0.0% Native Hawaiian or Pacific Islander
- 0.7% Two or more races
- 1.0% Hispanic or Latino (of any race)

=== 2000 ===
As of the census of 2000, there were 27,867 people, 10,578 households, and 7,700 families residing in the county. The population density was 22 people per square mile (8.5 people/km^{2}). There were 12,631 housing units at an average density of 10 units per square mile (3.9 units/km^{2}). The racial makeup of the county was 55.94% White, 43.02% Black or African American, 0.22% Native American, 0.16% Asian, 0.16% from other races, and 0.49% from two or more races. Nearly 0.65% of the population were Hispanic or Latino of any race.

There were 10,578 households, out of which 35.40% had children under the age of 18 living with them; 53.90% were married couples living together, 15.70% had a female householder with no husband present, and 27.20% were non-families. Nearly 25.50% of all households were made up of individuals, and 11.90% had someone living alone who was 65 years of age or older. The average household size was 2.60, and the average family size was 3.13.

In Clarke County, the population was spread out, with 28.00% under the age of 18, 8.50% from 18 to 24, 27.50% from 25 to 44, 22.50% from 45 to 64, and 13.50% who were 65 years of age or older. The median age was 36 years. For every 100 females, there were 89.70 males. For every 100 females age 18 and over, there were 84.60 males age 18 and over.

The median income for a household in the county was $27,388, and the median income for a family was $34,546. Males had a median income of $34,111 versus $19,075 for females. The per capita income for the county was $14,581. About 18.10% of families and 22.60% of the population were below the poverty line, including 29.60% of those under age 18 and 23.80% of those age 65 or over.

== Education ==
Clarke County contains two public school districts. There are approximately 3,400 students in public PK-12 schools in Clarke County.

=== Districts ===
School districts include:

- Clarke County School District
- Thomasville City School District

== Government ==
Since 1960, the majority of Clarke County voters has mostly supported Republican candidates for the presidency, but party affiliations have changed. Prior to the civil rights era, most whites were members of the Democratic Party, although they began to vote for Nixon and other Republican presidential candidates.

After the Civil War, many African Americans had joined the Republican Party, but they were essentially disenfranchised around the turn of the 20th century by state changes to its constitution and laws, making voter registration more difficult. After they regained their ability to vote through national legislation in the mid-1960s, they largely joined the Democratic Party, which had supported their effort to regain their constitutional civil rights.

Most conservative whites gradually left that party and joined the Republican Party. Voting and party affiliation in Clarke County, as throughout much of Alabama, is aligned by ethnicity, with conservative whites, the majority, voting for Republican candidates and African Americans supporting Democratic candidates.

For some positions, white voters have sometimes continued to vote for state-level Democrats, such as Doug Jones in 2017.

United States presidential election results for Clarke County, Alabama
Year	Republican		Democratic		Third party(ies)	
Year	No.	%	No.	%	No.	%
1904	79	6.39%	1,131	91.50%	26	2.10%
1908	56	4.51%	1,169	94.20%	16	1.29%
1912	13	1.21%	1,024	95.34%	37	3.45%
1916	25	1.74%	1,397	97.42%	12	0.84%
1920	43	3.30%	1,253	96.24%	6	0.46%
1924	78	6.77%	1,059	91.93%	15	1.30%
1928	936	36.03%	1,662	63.97%	0	0.00%
1932	53	2.15%	2,408	97.69%	4	0.16%
1936	60	2.19%	2,673	97.73%	2	0.07%
1940	48	1.26%	3,753	98.71%	1	0.03%
1944	142	5.90%	2,263	93.98%	3	0.12%
1948	47	2.23%	0	0.00%	2,063	97.77%
1952	1,303	29.45%	3,121	70.53%	1	0.02%
1956	1,246	38.76%	1,962	61.03%	7	0.22%
1960	2,016	50.82%	1,878	47.34%	73	1.84%
1964	4,460	82.84%	0	0.00%	924	17.16%
1968	488	5.66%	1,717	19.90%	6,421	74.44%
1972	5,256	70.89%	2,031	27.39%	127	1.71%
1976	4,126	45.81%	4,737	52.60%	143	1.59%
1980	5,059	47.44%	5,249	49.23%	355	3.33%
1984	6,282	58.11%	4,452	41.18%	77	0.71%
1988	5,708	56.97%	4,217	42.09%	95	0.95%
1992	5,495	46.90%	5,023	42.87%	1,199	10.23%
1996	4,785	47.29%	4,831	47.75%	502	4.96%
2000	5,988	55.69%	4,679	43.52%	85	0.79%
2004	6,730	59.07%	4,627	40.61%	37	0.32%
2008	7,466	55.57%	5,914	44.02%	55	0.41%
2012	7,470	53.90%	6,334	45.70%	56	0.40%
2016	7,140	54.79%	5,749	44.12%	142	1.09%
2020	7,324	55.76%	5,755	43.81%	56	0.43%
2024	6,965	58.25%	4,927	41.20%	66	0.55%

United States Senate election results for Clarke County, Alabama2
Year	Republican		Democratic		Third party(ies)	
Year	No.	%	No.	%	No.	%
2020	7,061	53.95%	6,017	45.98%	9	0.07%

United States Senate election results for Clarke County, Alabama3
Year	Republican		Democratic		Third party(ies)	
Year	No.	%	No.	%	No.	%
2022	5,348	59.30%	3,613	40.06%	58	0.64%

Alabama Gubernatorial election results for Clarke County
Year	Republican		Democratic		Third party(ies)	
Year	No.	%	No.	%	No.	%
2022	5,359	59.24%	3,556	39.31%	132	1.46%

== Communities ==
=== Cities ===
- Jackson
- Thomasville

=== Towns ===
- Coffeeville
- Fulton
- Grove Hill (county seat)

=== Census Designated Places ===
- Carlton
- Rockville
- Whatley

=== Unincorporated communities ===
- Alma
- Barlow Bend
- Bashi
- Campbell
- Dickinson
- Gainestown
- Gosport
- McEntyre
- Morvin
- Opine
- Salitpa
- Suggsville
- Tallahatta Springs
- Tattlersville
- Walker Springs

=== Former communities ===
- Choctaw Corner
- Clarkesville
- Failetown

== Notable people ==
- Loraine Bedsole Bush Tunstall (1881-1953), social reformer
- Martha Loftin Wilson (1834–1919), missionary worker, journal editor, heroine of the American Civil War

== See also ==
- National Register of Historic Places listings in Clarke County, Alabama
- Properties on the Alabama Register of Landmarks and Heritage in Clarke County, Alabama
