= 1932 Deep South tornado outbreak =

1932 windstorm in the southern United States

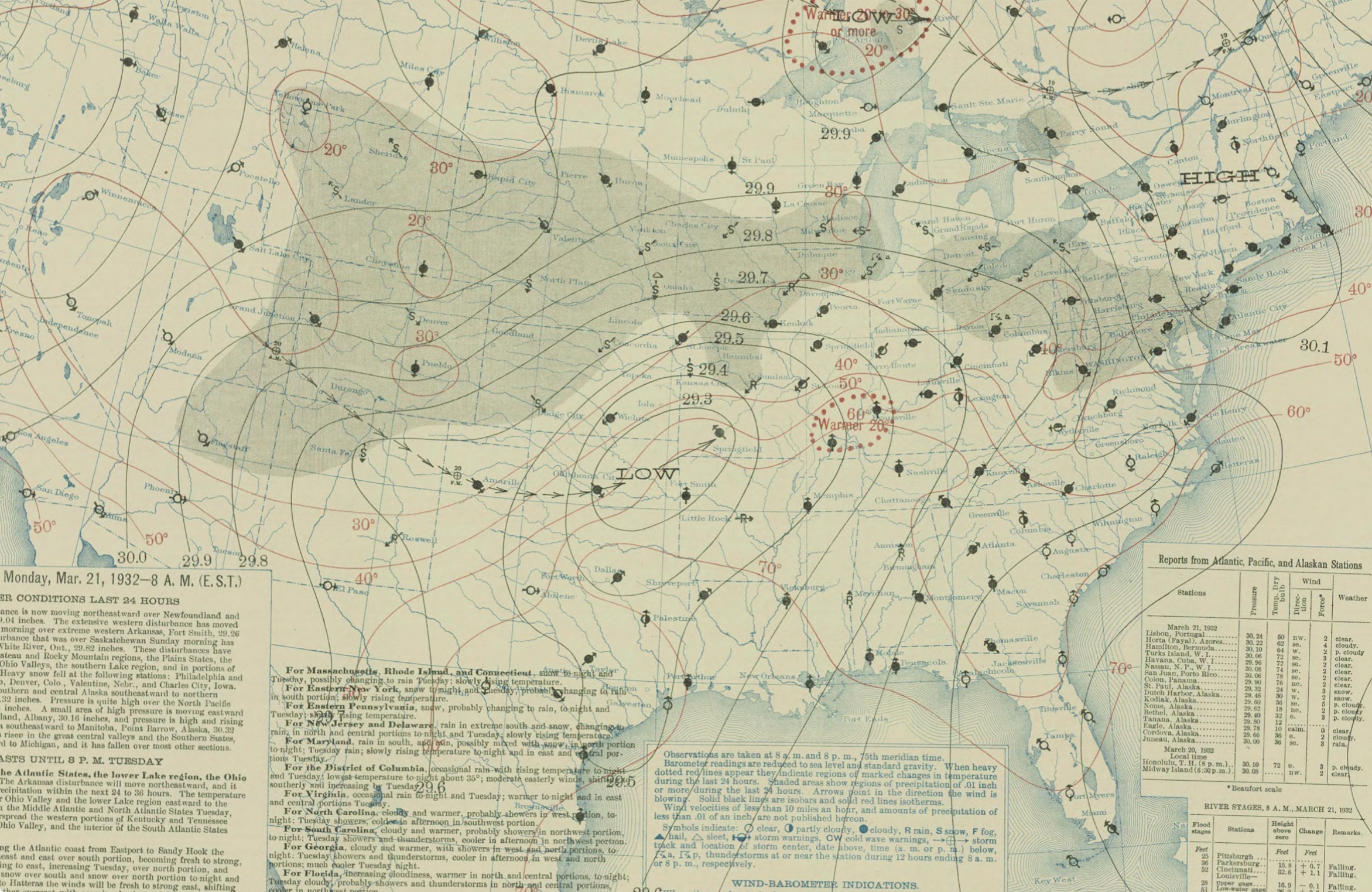
- Weather map on March 21, showing the low pressure system over Oklahoma that was associated with the tornado outbreak

Tornado outbreak
- Tornadoes: ≥ 38
- Max. rating: F4 tornado
- Duration: March 21–22, 1932

Overall effects
- Fatalities: > 330 (unofficial estimate of ~500)
- Injuries: 2,141
- Damage: ≥ $4.34 million ($102,410,000 in 2025 USD) (Note: All losses are in 1932 USD unless otherwise noted.)
- Areas affected: Midwestern and Southern United States
- Part of the tornadoes and tornado outbreaks of 1932

On March 21–22, 1932, a deadly tornado outbreak struck the Midwestern and Southern United States. At least 38 tornadoes—including 27 deadly tornadoes and several long-lived tornado families—struck the Deep South, killing more than 330 people and injuring 2,141. Tornadoes from that Monday into Tuesday affected areas from Mississippi north to Illinois and east to South Carolina, but Alabama was hardest hit, with 268 fatalities; the outbreak is considered to be the deadliest ever in Alabama, and among the worst ever in the United States, trailing only the Tri-State tornado outbreak in 1925, with 751 fatalities, and the Tupelo–Gainesville outbreak in 1936, with 454 fatalities. The 1932 outbreak is believed to have produced 10 violent tornadoes, eight of which occurred in Alabama alone. (Note: An outbreak is generally defined as a group of at least six tornadoes (the number sometimes varies slightly according to local climatology) with no more than a six-hour gap between individual tornadoes. An outbreak sequence, prior to (after) the start of modern records in 1950, is defined as a period of no more than two (one) consecutive days without at least one significant (F2 or stronger) tornado.)

== Background and impact ==
At 7 a.m. CST (13:00 UTC), a low-pressure area of about 29.26 inHg (991 mb) was over eastern Oklahoma and western Arkansas, with warm air moving north from the Gulf of Mexico to the Mississippi Valley. Conditions in Alabama and Mississippi were mostly cloudy with early thunderstorm activity, yet temperatures were already in the low 70s and upper 60s °F in Mississippi and western Tennessee. By afternoon, temperatures rose to the middle to upper 70s °F across most of the area. As a cold front approached Alabama, forecasters predicted afternoon thunderstorms and an end to the warm temperatures but did not anticipate the magnitude of the severe weather that later hit most of the state from north of Montgomery to the Tennessee and Georgia borders.

As the outbreak progressed, ten F4 tornadoes struck Alabama, Tennessee, and Georgia. In Alabama, within four hours of the first F4 tornado, 18 people were killed near the Cullman area in Cullman County; 14 in the Columbiana area in Shelby County; 41 in Coosa and Talladega counties near Sylacauga; and 38 people in other small communities in Northeastern Alabama, mostly in Jackson County. One of the tornadoes followed the deadly Jemison event by one hour and passed just 8 mi (13 km) to the southeast, killing 31 people in and around the Clanton area in Chilton County.

Outside Alabama, six people were killed near Pulaski, Tennessee, in Giles County. 13 people in the state died from this and six other strong tornadoes. In Georgia and Tennessee, a large tornado near the state line left a mile-wide damage path, and killed 15 people from Beaverdale, Georgia, to Conasauga, Tennessee. Two other tornadoes in Georgia killed a combined 16 people and were on the ground almost simultaneously. On March 22, tornadoes continued after midnight CST (06:00 UTC) as four more strong tornadoes struck Georgia and South Carolina until 2:00 a.m. CST (08:00 UTC). One of them passed near the University of Georgia in Athens and killed 12 people.

== Confirmed tornadoes ==
Confirmed tornadoes by Fujita rating
FU	F0	F1	F2	F3	F4	F5	Total
2	?	?	16	10	10	0	≥ 38

Prior to 1990, there is a likely undercount of tornadoes, particularly E/F0–1, with reports of weaker tornadoes becoming more common as population increased. A sharp increase in the annual average E/F0–1 count by approximately 200 tornadoes was noted upon the implementation of NEXRAD Doppler weather radar in 1990–1991. (Note: Historically, the number of tornadoes globally and in the United States was and is likely underrepresented: research by Grazulis on annual tornado activity suggests that, as of 2001, only 53% of yearly U.S. tornadoes were officially recorded. Documentation of tornadoes outside the United States was historically less exhaustive, owing to the lack of monitors in many nations and, in some cases, to internal political controls on public information. Most countries only recorded tornadoes that produced severe damage or loss of life. Significant low biases in U.S. tornado counts likely occurred through the early 1990s, when advanced NEXRAD was first installed and the National Weather Service began comprehensively verifying tornado occurrences.) 1974 marked the first year where significant tornado (E/F2+) counts became homogenous with contemporary values, attributed to the consistent implementation of Fujita scale assessments. (Note: The Fujita scale was devised under the aegis of scientist T. Theodore Fujita in the early 1970s. Prior to the advent of the scale in 1971, tornadoes in the United States were officially unrated. While the Fujita scale has been superseded by the Enhanced Fujita scale in the U.S. since February 1, 2007, Canada used the old scale until April 1, 2013; nations elsewhere, like the United Kingdom, apply other classifications such as the TORRO scale.) Numerous discrepancies on the details of tornadoes in this outbreak exist between sources. The total count of tornadoes and ratings differs from various agencies accordingly. The list below documents information from the most contemporary official sources alongside assessments from tornado historian Thomas P. Grazulis.

List of confirmed tornadoes in the tornado outbreak of March 21–22, 1932
F#	Location	County / Parish	State	Date (Note: All dates are based on the local time zone where the tornado touched down; however, all times are in Coordinated Universal Time and dates are split at midnight CST/CDT for consistency.)	Time (UTC)	Path length	Width (Note: The listed width values are primarily the average/mean width of the tornadoes, with those having known maximum widths denoted by ♯. From 1952 to 1994, reports largely list mean width whereas contemporary years list maximum width. Values provided by Grazulis are the average width, with estimates being rounded down (i.e. 0.5 mi (0.80 km) is rounded down from 880 yards to 800 yards.)	Damage
F2	Near Strong	Monroe	Mississippi	March 21	20:00–?	Unknown	Unknown	Unknown
F2	A strong tornado unroofed and wrecked three homes.							
F2	Carrier Mills to W of Harrisburg	Saline	Illinois	March 21	21:00–?	6 mi (9.7 km)	15 yd (14 m)	$10,000
F2	A tornado damaged eight houses and destroyed a barn.							
F3	Southeastern Demopolis	Marengo, Greene, Hale	Alabama	March 21	21:15–?	7 mi (11 km)	125 yd (114 m)	Unknown
F3	3 deaths – This intense tornado destroyed or damaged approximately 15 homes. Nine people were injured.							
F3	Near Spurgeon	Pike	Indiana	March 21	21:30–?	Unknown	Unknown	Unknown
F3	This intense tornado destroyed or damaged five farmhouses. One of them was completely swept away, along with its contents, and the others were unroofed. One person was injured. The tornado neared F4 intensity.							
F2	SW of Linden to Faunsdale	Marengo, Perry	Alabama	March 21	21:30–?	20 mi (32 km)	200 yd (180 m)	Unknown
F2	3 deaths – 12 people were injured.							
F4	Near Ralph to northwestern Tuscaloosa to Northport	Tuscaloosa	Alabama	March 21	22:00–?	20 mi (32 km)	400 yd (370 m)	
F4	37 deaths – This violent tornado destroyed 98 houses, damaged at least 300 others, and left 2,000 people homeless. It leveled the Tuscaloosa Country Club and caused sporadic F2-to-F3-level damage in the city. At least 200 people were injured.							
F3	Western Mitchell to E of Bedford	Lawrence	Indiana	March 21	22:15–?	11 mi (18 km)	200 yd (180 m)	$50,000
F3	This intense tornado destroyed 12 barns and seven or more homes. Three of the homes incurred borderline-F4 damage. Six people were injured.							
F4	S of Cullman to W of Arab	Cullman, Morgan, Marshall	Alabama	March 21	22:30–?	25 mi (40 km)	600 yd (550 m)	
F4	18 deaths – This violent tornado impacted rural communities and farmlands, leveling numerous small homes and scores of outbuildings. The hardest-hit areas were in and near Phelan, Bolte, Berlin, and Fairview. 74 houses were wrecked in Cullman County, the site of all known fatalities. Six of the deaths occurred in a single home. At least 100 people were injured.							
F4	N of Marion to Cox to Union Grove	Perry, Bibb, Chilton, Shelby, Coosa	Alabama	March 21	22:30–?	60 mi (97 km)	800 yd (730 m)	
F4	49+ deaths – This violent, long-tracked tornado—the first in a series that paralleled each other—was the deadliest on record in Alabama until the Hackleburg–Phil Campbell EF5 on April 27, 2011. Rural communities were reportedly obliterated, small homes swept away, and entire families extirpated; one family lost seven members. 150 injuries were reported, and additional fatalities may have occurred.							
F2	Unknown	Lewis	Tennessee	March 21	23:00–?	Unknown	Unknown	
F2	This strong tornado destroyed a tenant house, injuring eight people.							
F2	Near Hunt City to near Kibbie to Annapolis	Jasper, Crawford	Illinois	March 21	23:00–?	7 mi (11 km)	100 yd (91 m)	
F2	This tornado generated only F1-level damage in Jasper County, wrecking a chicken coop and partially unroofing a house. As it entered Crawford County the tornado unroofed another house and damaged four farmsteads. Only one person was injured along the path.							
F4	Southwestern Columbiana	Shelby, Talladega	Alabama	March 21	23:10–?	20 mi (32 km)	200 yd (180 m)	$100,000
F4	14 deaths – This narrow-but-violent tornado damaged or destroyed more than 240 houses, 20 of which were leveled. Farmsteads were damaged as well. 75 people were injured.							
F4	W of Plantersville to Marble Valley	Perry, Chilton, Coosa	Alabama	March 21	23:30–?	50 mi (80 km)	800 yd (730 m)	
F4	31+ deaths – This violent, long-lived tornado killed 19 people in and near Stanton and Lomax, injured at least 200 others, and destroyed numerous homes, many of which were obliterated. Both the Cox–Union Grove F4 and this may have been tornado families; as in the first event, whole families were killed.							
F4	W of Pulaski	Giles	Tennessee	March 21	23:30–?	13 mi (21 km)	250 yd (230 m)	$120,000
F4	6 deaths – This violent tornado, as severe on hilltops as in valleys, leveled 10 houses. One of the homes was reportedly swept away. At least 18 people were injured.							
F2	SW of Leiper's Fork to W of Hunters Point	Williamson, Davidson, Wilson	Tennessee	March 21	00:00–?	50 mi (80 km)	150 yd (140 m)	
F2	3 deaths – This strong tornado damaged or destroyed homes and barns on five farmsteads. One of the farms abutted a neighboring property that featured a death in a separate tornado on April 29, 1909. Eight people were injured.							
F3	S of Lewisburg to NE of Belfast	Marshall	Tennessee	March 21	00:00–?	10 mi (16 km)	600 yd (550 m)	
F3	1 death – This intense tornado destroyed 13 or more houses and injured 20 people. A rug was carried 2 mi (3.2 km) away and left in a treetop.							
F2	Northeastern Evansville	Vanderburgh	Indiana	March 21	00:15–?	1 mi (1.6 km)	150 yd (140 m)	$200,000
F2	This brief-but-strong tornado destroyed a garage; unroofed a house and a furniture store; and shifted four houses off their foundations.							
F2	Uniontown	Union	Kentucky	March 21	00:15–?	0.5 mi (0.80 km)	70 yd (64 m)	$50,000
F2	2 deaths – This tornado destroyed 15 small houses, a hotel, and four businesses. Seven people were injured.							
F4	Near Beaverdale (GA) to near Conasauga (TN)	Whitfield (GA), Murray (GA), Polk (TN)	Georgia, Tennessee	March 21	00:15–?	20 mi (32 km)	600 yd (550 m)	
F4	15 deaths – This large, exceptionally violent tornado, up to 1 mi (1.6 km) in width, leveled houses beside the Conasauga River, killed a family of five, and injured 50 people. Small homes were reportedly obliterated in both Tennessee and Georgia.							
F3	N of Seney to western Rydal to ENE of Funkhouser	Polk, Floyd, Bartow	Georgia	March 21	00:30–?	30 mi (48 km)	500 yd (460 m)	$50,000
F3	12 deaths – This intense tornado destroyed or damaged 60 houses, injuring 80 people. Most of the fatalities occurred in the Macedonia community. Parts of a church were carried 2 mi (3.2 km) away.							
F3	Near Taylorsville to Salacoa	Bartow, Cherokee	Georgia	March 21	00:30–?	25 mi (40 km)	200 yd (180 m)	$50,000
F3	4 deaths – This intense tornado paralleled the preceding event and destroyed or damaged 20 homes, including a nine-room residence. At least 30 people were injured.							
F2	ENE of Woodbury	Cannon	Tennessee	March 21	01:00–?	Unknown	Unknown	
F2	2 deaths – This strong tornado destroyed 10 houses in and near Sugar Tree and Mount Ararat. 10 people were injured.							
F2	Greensboro	Hale, Perry	Alabama	March 21	01:00–?	10 mi (16 km)	400 yd (370 m)	$25,000
F2	1 death – This tornado unroofed part of a high school and several houses. One person was injured.							
F3	W of Faunsdale to near Laneville to Scotts Prairie	Marengo, Hale, Perry	Alabama	March 21	01:00–?	20 mi (32 km)	100 yd (91 m)	
F3	10+ deaths – This intense tornado, which may have reached F4 intensity, leveled temporary housing on a plantation and swept away a well-built farmhouse. Numerous barns were wrecked as well. The number of dead unofficially ranged from 12 to 20, and 30 other people were injured. Losses from three tornadoes in Marengo County totaled $400,000.							
F4	Gantts Quarry to northwestern Sylacauga to Chandler Springs	Talladega	Alabama	March 21	01:10–?	25 mi (40 km)	400 yd (370 m)	$1,500,000
F4	41+ deaths – This violent tornado likely formed from the same storm as the Stanton–Marble Valley F4. It destroyed or damaged 635 houses and left 1,300 people homeless, primarily in Sylacauga but also in a number of remote communities. At least 325 people were injured.							
F2	Piney Grove	Lawrence, Morgan	Alabama	March 21	01:30–?	5 mi (8.0 km)	Unknown	
F2	4 deaths – This tornado destroyed small houses and injured 10 people.							
F3	Near Corinth to near Battleground	Winston, Cullman, Morgan	Alabama	March 21	01:30–?	10 mi (16 km)	200 yd (180 m)	
F3	8 deaths – This intense tornado injured 25 people and destroyed approximately 30 houses. One of the dead was reportedly carried 1/2 mi (0.80 km) away.							
F2	W of Huntsville	Scott	Tennessee	March 21	01:50–?	Unknown	Unknown	
F2	A strong tornado destroyed small houses and injured 13 people. Items of clothing were found in trees more than 1 mi (1.6 km) distant.							
F3	Southeastern Charleston to eastern Calhoun	Bradley, McMinn	Tennessee	March 21	01:50–?	10 mi (16 km)	300 yd (270 m)	$60,000
F3	1 death – This intense tornado destroyed 20 houses. Debris was found 4–20 mi (6.4–32.2 km) away. At least 21 people sustained injuries.							
F4	ENE of Sylacauga to Newell	Talladega, Clay, Randolph	Alabama	March 21	02:00–?	45 mi (72 km)	400 yd (370 m)	$300,000
F4	13 deaths – This long-tracked, violent tornado destroyed 75 houses, as well as structures on 110 farms, in the communities of Bulls Gap, Quenelda, Hassell Gap, and Bellview. Many small homes were leveled along the path. Nearly 400 people were left homeless by the tornado, and at least 150 others were reportedly injured.							
F4	SW of Lacey's Spring (AL) to Ladds (TN)	Morgan (AL), Madison (AL), Jackson (AL), Marion (TN)	Alabama, Tennessee	March 21	02:00–?	75 mi (121 km)	400 yd (370 m)	$750,000
F4	38+ deaths – This long-tracked tornado family likely consisted of up to three tornadoes. It injured 500 others and destroyed 125 houses, but mainly impacted very remote areas. Personal items were found 105 mi (169 km) away.							
F2	Near Green Hill	Lauderdale	Alabama	March 21	Unknown	Unknown	Unknown	
F2	A cotton mill and a home were wrecked.							
FU	Rosebloom	Tallahatchie	Mississippi	March 21	Unknown	Unknown	Unknown	
FU	Details are unknown.							
FU	Goodman	Holmes	Mississippi	March 21	Unknown	Unknown	Unknown	
FU	Details are unknown.							
F2	Fairmont	Spartanburg	South Carolina	March 22	06:00–?	9 mi (14 km)	200 yd (180 m)	
F2	2 deaths – This tornado destroyed 20 tenant houses and injured 30 people.							
F2	E of Cowpens to NW of Gaffney	Cherokee	South Carolina	March 22	06:30–?	8 mi (13 km)	Unknown	
F2	1 death – Five people were injured.							
F3	Southern Athens to Paoli	Clarke, Madison	Georgia	March 22	06:45–?	18 mi (29 km)	200 yd (180 m)	$150,000
F3	12 deaths – This intense tornado passed near the University of Georgia and destroyed or damaged approximately 100 houses. At least 35 people were injured.							
F2	Unknown	Jones, Baldwin	Georgia	March 22	08:00–?	7 mi (11 km)	70 yd (64 m)	$25,000
F2	1 death – A strong tornado destroyed seven houses, including a historic structure. Most of the homes were small. Five people were injured.							

== Aftermath and recovery ==
The outbreak was the most damaging on record in the Southeastern United States since February 19–20, 1884. At least 25 cities and communities in Alabama reported one fatality or more during the day, including Demopolis, Union Grove, Linden, Plantersville, Sycamore, Northport, Huntsville, Marion, Stanton, Scottsboro, Paint Rock, Columbiana, Faunsdale, Bethel Church, Jemison, Falkville, Sylacauga, Bridgeport, Lineville, Gantts Quarry, Cullman, and Corinth. 11 counties were particularly hard hit, with 7,000 homes and businesses destroyed statewide. Seven tornadoes each caused at least 100 injuries in Alabama and Tennessee, with a total of 1,750 injuries in Alabama alone. In all, the 38 recorded tornadoes caused at least $4.34 million (1932 USD) in damages for the entire outbreak.

== Oddities/records ==
The March 21 outbreak is also nicknamed a Super Outbreak by the National Weather Service office in Birmingham, the only other episodes thusly designated being those of April 3, 1974, and April 27, 2011. While Alabama was the hardest-hit state with 86 fatalities, 75 of which were tornado-related, during the 1974 event, there were nearly three times as many fatalities in the state on March 21, 1932. Also, many tornadoes in rural areas this day likely caused more injuries and probably higher fatalities than reported, as newspapers paid little attention to the deaths of Black sharecroppers, whose families and identities were often unknown. Such a racial aspect was common during natural disasters in the South before desegregation in the late 20th century. The 1932 outbreak was also known for its violence: it set a 24-hour record for violent touchdowns in a single state until the 1974 Super Outbreak produced 11 F4 or F5 tornadoes in Kentucky.

Just six days later, on March 27, several other tornadoes struck Alabama again, with an F3 tornado traveling 30 mi (48 km), passing south of Jemison, and killing five people near Thorsby and Collins Chapel. Sightseers who visited the area to view damage from March 21 were forced to take shelter as the funnel cloud neared. This tornado was photographed and incorrectly labeled as the F4 tornado that hit the area, also near Jemison in Shelby County, on March 21.

== See also ==
- Tornado outbreak of March 21–22, 1952 – Produced at least 8 violent tornadoes exactly 20 years later
- List of North American tornadoes and tornado outbreaks

== Sources ==
- Agee, Ernest M.; Childs, Samuel (June 1, 2014). "Adjustments in Tornado Counts, F-Scale Intensity, and Path Width for Assessing Significant Tornado Destruction". Journal of Applied Meteorology and Climatology. 53 (6). American Meteorological Society: 1494–1505. Bibcode:2014JApMC..53.1494A. doi:10.1175/JAMC-D-13-0235.1.
- Brooks, Harold E. (April 2004). "On the Relationship of Tornado Path Length and Width to Intensity". Weather and Forecasting. 19 (2): 310–19. Bibcode:2004WtFor..19..310B. doi:10.1175/1520-0434(2004)019<0310:OTROTP>2.0.CO;2.
- Cook, A. R.; Schaefer, J. T. (August 2008). "The Relation of El Niño–Southern Oscillation (ENSO) to Winter Tornado Outbreaks". Monthly Weather Review. 136 (8): 3121–3137. Bibcode:2008MWRv..136.3121C. doi:10.1175/2007MWR2171.1.
- Grazulis, Thomas P. (May 1984). Violent Tornado Climatography, 1880–1982. OSTI (Technical report). NUREG. Washington, D.C.: Nuclear Regulatory Commission. OSTI 7099491. CR-3670.
  - — (November 1990). Significant Tornadoes 1880–1989. Vol. 2. St. Johnsbury, Vermont: The Tornado Project of Environmental Films. ISBN 1-879362-02-3.
  - — (July 1993). Significant Tornadoes 1680–1991: A Chronology and Analysis of Events. St. Johnsbury, Vermont: The Tornado Project of Environmental Films. ISBN 1-879362-03-1.
  - — (2001a). The Tornado: Nature's Ultimate Windstorm. Norman: University of Oklahoma Press. ISBN 978-0-8061-3538-0.
  - — (2001b). F5-F6 Tornadoes. St. Johnsbury, Vermont: The Tornado Project of Environmental Films.
- Hunter, H. C. (March 1932). "The tornadoes of the latter part of March, 1932". Monthly Weather Review. 60 (3). American Meteorological Society: 89. Bibcode:1932MWRv...60...89H. doi:10.1175/1520-0493(1932)60<89:TTOTLP>2.0.CO;2.
- "Severe local storms, March, 1932". Monthly Weather Review. 60 (3): 88–9. March 1932. Bibcode:1932MWRv...60...88.. doi:10.1175/1520-0493(1932)60<88:SLSM>2.0.CO;2.
