= Bug Tussle, Alabama =

Unincorporated community in Alabama, United States

Bug Tussle is a rural district in Cullman County, Alabama. It is located near the Cullman County and Walker County border. It is close to Bremen, Alabama and Lewis Smith Lake, along Alabama Highway 69 and Alabama State Route 91, and is southwest of the city of Cullman.

Bug Tussle got its name after an early settler climbed a nearby mountain and said the people below looked like "bugs tussling".

== Geography ==
Bug Tussle is located at 33°59′40″N 86°58′12″W. According to the U.S. Census Bureau the land area of the CCD is about 148.16 square miles (383.7 km^{2}).

== Transportation ==
- State Route 69
- State Route 91

== Demographics ==
According to the 2000 census, the Bug Tussle/Bremen census county division (which also included Colony, part of Dodge City, and part of Good Hope) had a population of 8,198 with a population density of about 55.3 inhabitants per square mile (21.4/km^{2}). There were 3,158 households and 2,488 families in the CCD. The racial makeup of the CCD was 92.6% White, 5.98% Black, <1% from other races, and <1% from two or more races. <1% of the population were Hispanic or Latino of any race. The median age of the CCD was 37.3. 24.5% of the population were under age 18, 8.5% were age 18 to 24, 28.8% were age 25 to 44, 26.1% were age 45 to 64, and 12% were age 65 or older. There were 101.4 males for every 100 females in the CCD.

== Education ==
- Cold Springs Elementary: K-6
- Cold Springs High School: 7-p012

== Tourist attractions, recreation, and places/points of interest ==
- Lewis Smith Lake
