= Black Bottom, Alabama =

Unincorporated community in Alabama, United States

- Unincorporated community
- Location within Alabama Location within the United States
- Coordinates: 33°56′53″N 86°51′36″W
- Country: United States
- State: Alabama
- County: Cullman
- Elevation: 322 ft (98 m)
- Time zone: UTC-6 (Central (CST))
  - Summer (DST): UTC-5 (CDT)
- Area codes: 256 & 938
- GNIS feature ID: 114396

Black Bottom is an unincorporated community in Cullman County, Alabama, United States, located near the junction of Interstate 65 and Alabama State Route 91, 2.4 miles (3.9 km) east of Colony.
