= Beaverdale =

Beaverdale may refer to:

- Beaverdale, Georgia, an unincorporated community in Whitfield County
- Beaverdale, Iowa (disambiguation)
- Beaverdale, Pennsylvania, an unincorporated community and census-designated place (CDP) in Cambria County

== See also ==
- Beaver Dale, a community in Saskatchewan, Canada
