= Walter, Alabama =

Unincorporated community in Alabama, United States

- Unincorporated community
- Location within Alabama Location within the United States
- Coordinates: 34°07′07″N 86°40′37″W
- Country: United States
- State: Alabama
- County: Cullman
- Elevation: 718 ft (219 m)
- Time zone: UTC-6 (Central (CST))
  - Summer (DST): UTC-5 (CDT)
- Area codes: 256 & 938
- GNIS feature ID: 128561

Walter is an unincorporated community in Cullman County, Alabama, United States. Walter is located on Alabama State Route 91, 7.2 miles (11.6 km) northeast of Hanceville.

== History ==
Walter is named for the son of the community's first postmaster. A post office operated under the name Walter from 1888 to 1905.
