= Brooklyn, Alabama =

Brooklyn, Alabama may refer to the following places in Alabama:

- Brooklyn, Coffee County, Alabama
- Brooklyn, Conecuh County, Alabama
- Brooklyn, Cullman County, Alabama
