= Simcoe, Alabama =

Unincorporated community in Alabama, United States

- Unincorporated community
- Location within Alabama Location within the United States
- Coordinates: 34°13′27″N 86°44′04″W
- Country: United States
- State: Alabama
- County: Cullman
- Elevation: 948 ft (289 m)
- Time zone: UTC-6 (Central (CST))
  - Summer (DST): UTC-5 (CDT)
- Area codes: 256 & 938
- GNIS feature ID: 126860

Simcoe is an unincorporated community in Cullman County, Alabama, United States, located on Alabama State Route 69, 3.7 miles (6.0 km) southwest of Fairview.

== History ==
Simcoe is named for Lake Simcoe, a lake in Ontario. A post office operated under the name Simcoe from 1884 to 1903.
