= Arkadelphia, Alabama =

Unincorporated community in Alabama, United States

- Unincorporated community
- Location in Alabama.
- Coordinates: 33°54′18″N 86°57′45″W
- Country: United States
- State: Alabama
- County: Cullman
- Elevation: 367 ft (112 m)
- Time zone: UTC-6 (Central (CST))
  - Summer (DST): UTC-5 (CDT)
- ZIP code: 35077, 35033
- Area code: 256
- GNIS feature ID: 113207

Arkadelphia is an unincorporated community in Cullman County, Alabama, United States.

== History ==
Arkadelphia was settled in the 19th century, with a post office opening in 1854. It was initially located with Blount County. The town's etymology is disputed. Some believe Arkadelphia was the name of the wife of the first postmaster John A. Donaldson. Some believe it is a combination of "Ark-", the name of an early settlement in nearby Winston County, and "-adelphia", a pseudo-Greek combination meaning "brother-place," likely taken from Philadelphia. There is no known connection to Arkadelphia, Arkansas, founded as Blakeleytown and renamed Arkadelphia in 1839 and subsequently incorporated in 1846. After redrawing the county lines around 1900, it was shifted into Cullman County.

Railroad engineer J.E. Willoughby was born in Arkadelphia in 1871.

Arkadelphia is located on Alabama State Route 91.

== Demographics ==
=== Arkadelphia Village ===
Historical population
Census	Pop.	Note	%±
1880	195		—
U.S. Decennial Census

Arkadelphia first appeared on the 1880 U.S. Census as an unincorporated village within Blount County. The population of the village made it the second largest community in the county behind the then-county seat of Blountsville. The village did not report again on the census, although the precinct bearing its name appeared in 1890 and continued to report until 1950. See precinct below.

=== Historic Demographics ===
Census Year	Population	State Place Rank	Blount County Place Rank
1880 (Note: 1st year Arkadelphia reported on census)	195 (-) (Note: (-)Indicates no immediate prior population figure or rank) (Note: Racial demographics not reported for places of less than 2,500 on 1880 census.)	105th (-)	2nd (-) (Note: In 1880, Arkadelphia was in Blount County)

== Arkadelphia Precinct: Blount County (1890-1900); Cullman County (1910-50) ==
Historical population
Census	Pop.	Note	%±
1890	1,173		—
1900	918		−21.7%
1910	836		−8.9%
1920	889		6.3%
1930	1,006		13.2%
1940	1,131		12.4%
1950	944		−16.5%
U.S. Decennial Census

The Arkadelphia Precinct (Blount County 24th Precinct) first appeared on the 1890 U.S. Census. With the redrawing of the county lines after 1900, and Arkadelphia's shift into Cullman County, the new 7th precinct of Cullman County bore the name of Arkadelphia and continued to report on the census from 1910 to 1950. In 1960, the precinct was merged as part of a larger reorganization of counties into the census division of Bremen.
