= Vinemont, Alabama =

Unincorporated community in Alabama, United States

Vinenont, North Vinemont
- Unincorporated community
- Vinemont, Alabama
- Location in Alabama
- Coordinates: 34°14′30.4″N 86°51′58″W
- Country: United States
- State: Alabama
- County: Cullman

Area
  - Total: 9.34 sq mi (24.2 km^{2})
  - Land: 9.31 sq mi (24.1 km^{2})
  - Water: 0.035 sq mi (0.091 km^{2})
- Elevation: 907 ft (276 m)

Population (July 2017)
  - Total: 948
  - Density: 96.4/sq mi (37.2/km^{2})
- Time zone: UTC-6 (Central (CST)0864432W)
  - Summer (DST): UTC-5 (CDT)
- ZIP code: 35179
- Area code: 256
- GNIS feature ID: 128463

Vinemont is an unincorporated community in Cullman County, Alabama, United States, located roughly 7 miles (11 km) north of the city of Cullman. The population as of July 2017 was 948. The community of Vinemont borders the incorporated town of South Vinemont (population 425). Vinemont elementary, middle and high schools are located in South Vinemont.

== Notable people ==
- Don Brandon, longtime college baseball coach at Anderson University in Indiana
- James E. Martin, president of Auburn University from 1984 to 1992 and of the University of Arkansas from 1980 to 1984
- Hank Williams Jr., lived in Vinemont for a good spell.
