= Super Outbreak =

Super Outbreak refers to an informal classification of widespread and deadly tornado outbreak.

Super Outbreak may refer to:

- Tornado outbreak sequence of May 25 – June 1, 1917
- 1932 Deep South tornado outbreak, often called the "1932 Super Outbreak"
- 1974 Super Outbreak
- 2008 Super Tuesday tornado outbreak
- 2011 Super Outbreak

== See also ==
- List of tornado outbreaks by Outbreak Intensity Score § Super outbreaks
