= Don Brandon =

American college baseball coach

Biographical details
- Born: c. 1941 (age 84–85); Vinemont, Alabama, U.S.
- Education: Anderson University (1963); Ball State University (1967); Springfield College (1976)

Playing career

Football
- 1959–1962: Anderson (IN)

Basketball
- 1960–1963: Anderson (IN)

Baseball
- 1960–1963: Anderson (IN)
- Positions: End (football); Pitcher (baseball)

Coaching career (HC unless noted)

Football
- 1964: Anderson (IN) (JV)
- 1965–1966: Anderson HS (IN) (assistant JV)
- 1967: Anderson HS (IN) (JV)
- 1968–1975: Anderson (IN) (assistant)
- 1976–1977: Anderson (IN)

Basketball
- 1968–?: Anderson (IN) (assistant)

Baseball
- 1965–1967: Anderson HS (IN) (assistant)
- 1968–1971: Anderson (IN) (assistant)
- 1972: Anderson (IN)
- 1973: Anderson (IN) (assistant)
- 1974–2010: Anderson (IN)

Track and field
- 1965–1967: Anderson HS (IN)

Administrative career (AD unless noted)
- 1975–1978: Anderson (IN)

Head coaching record
- Overall: 1,110–588 (college baseball); 6–12 (college football)

Accomplishments and honors

Championships
- NCCAA National Championship (1991)

Awards
- Football; 2× All-Hoosier Conference (1961–1962); Baseball; 2× All-Hoosier Conference (1962–1963)

Don P. Brandon (born c. 1941) is an American former college baseball head coach and former college athlete. He coached at Anderson University in Indiana for 38 seasons.

== Biography ==
Brandon served as head coach of the Anderson Ravens baseball team in 1972 and from 1974 to 2010. He recorded 1,110 wins and 588 losses, for a .654 winning percentage. He led the Ravens to 13 conference titles, 12 NAIA District titles, 5 NAIA World Series appearances (1984, 1987, 1993, 1998, and 2003) and the 1991 National Christian College Athletic Association National Championship.

Brandon attended Anderson University and Ball State University, where he earned degrees in 1963 and 1967, respectively. He later earned a doctorate at Springfield College in Massachusetts in 1976. While a student at Anderson, Brandon earned varsity letters in baseball and football, and also played on the basketball team. Anderson's baseball coach at that time was former Brooklyn Dodgers player Carl Erskine.

Brandon first coached at Anderson in 1968, as an assistant with the football and basketball teams. He later was an assistant baseball coach under Erskine. Brandon served as head coach of the baseball team in 1972, with Erskine coaching a final season in 1973. Brandon then was head coach from 1974 through 2010.

Born in Vinemont, Alabama, Brandon graduated from high school in Cullman, Alabama, in 1959. He was inducted to the Cullman County, Alabama, Sports Hall of Fame in 2011, and the Anderson University Athletic Hall of Fame in 2010. Brandon married in 1962; he and his wife have two children.

== Head coaching record ==
=== College football ===
Year	Team	Overall	Conference	Standing	Bowl/playoffs
Anderson Ravens (Hoosier–Buckeye Conference) (1976–1977)
1976	Anderson	3–6	3–5	7th	
1977	Anderson	3–6	3–5	6th	
Anderson:		6–12	6–10		
Total:		6–12			

== See also ==
- List of college baseball career coaching wins leaders
