= Bremen, Alabama =

Unincorporated community in Alabama, United States

- Unincorporated community
- Location in Alabama.
- Coordinates: 33°59′40″N 86°58′12″W
- Country: United States
- State: Alabama
- County: Cullman
- Elevation: 564 ft (172 m)
- Time zone: UTC-6 (Central (CST)0865812W)
  - Summer (DST): UTC-5 (CDT)
- ZIP code: 35033
- Area code: 256
- GNIS feature ID: 114864

Bremen /ˈbri.mən/ is an unincorporated town in Cullman County, Alabama, United States.

== History ==
The Bremen community was founded with the name Empire in 1860. In order to prevent confusion with Empire in Walker County, the name was changed in 1879 by the town's first postmaster, James Macentepe. The name was chosen to honor the city of Bremen, Germany.

== Geography ==
Bremen is located at 33°59′40″N 86°58′12″W. According to the U.S. Census Bureau the land area of the CCD is about 148.16 square miles (88.9 km^{2}).

=== Major highways ===
- State Route 69
- State Route 91

== Demographics ==
Historical population
Census	Pop.	Note	%±
1880	51		—
U.S. Decennial Census

Bremen was listed on the 1880 U.S. Census as an unincorporated community with a population of 51. It has not been listed in any successive censuses to date.

According to the 2000 census, the Bremen census county division (which also included Colony, part of Dodge City, and part of Good Hope) had a population of 8,198 with a population density of about 33.2/km^{2} (55.3/sq mi). There were 3,158 households and 2,488 families in the CCD. The racial makeup of the CCD was 92.6% White, 5.98% Black, <1% from other races, and <1% from two or more races. <1% of the population were Hispanic or Latino of any race. The median age of the CCD was 37.3. 24.5% of the population were under age 18, 8.5% were age 18 to 24, 28.8% were age 25 to 44, 26.1% were age 45 to 64, and 12% were age 65 or older. There were 101.4 males for every 100 females in the CCD.

== Education ==
- Cold Springs Elementary: K-6
- Cold Springs High School: 7-12

== Notable people ==
- Sam Goodman, Southern Gospel singer
