= Baileyton =

Baileyton may refer to:

- Baileyton, Alabama
- Baileyton, Tennessee
