= Wilburn, Alabama =

Unincorporated community in Alabama, United States

Wilburn
- Unincorporated community
- Wilburn's position in Alabama.
- Coordinates: 33°57′06″N 87°02′03″W
- Country: United States
- State: Alabama
- County: Cullman
- Elevation: 525 ft (160 m)
- Time zone: UTC-6 (Central (CST))
  - Summer (DST): UTC-5 (CDT)
- GNIS feature ID: 153986

Wilburn is an unincorporated community in Cullman County, Alabama, United States, located just outside Bug Tussle.
