= Stanton, Alabama =

- Unincorporated community
- Location within the state of Alabama Stanton, Alabama (the United States)
- Coordinates: 32°44′8″N 86°53′58″W
- Country: United States
- State: Alabama
- County: Chilton
- Elevation: 335 ft (102 m)
- Time zone: UTC-6 (Central (CST))
  - Summer (DST): UTC-5 (CDT)
- ZIP code: 36790
- Area codes: 205, 659

Stanton is an unincorporated community in Chilton County, Alabama, United States. The community has a post office, with postmasters appointed from 1883 to 2006. A wedge tornado struck here on March 21, 1932 taking seven lives.

== Geography ==
Stanton is located at 32.73568°N 86.89971°W and has an elevation of 335 feet (102 m).

== Churches ==
There are two churches in Stanton, Ebenezer Baptist Church, established in 1819, and Stanton Bible Methodist Church, established in 1931.

== United States Civil War ==
The Battle of Ebenezer Church took place near Stanton on April 1, 1865, during Wilson's Raid into Alabama in the final full month of the American Civil War.
