= West Point, Alabama =

- Town
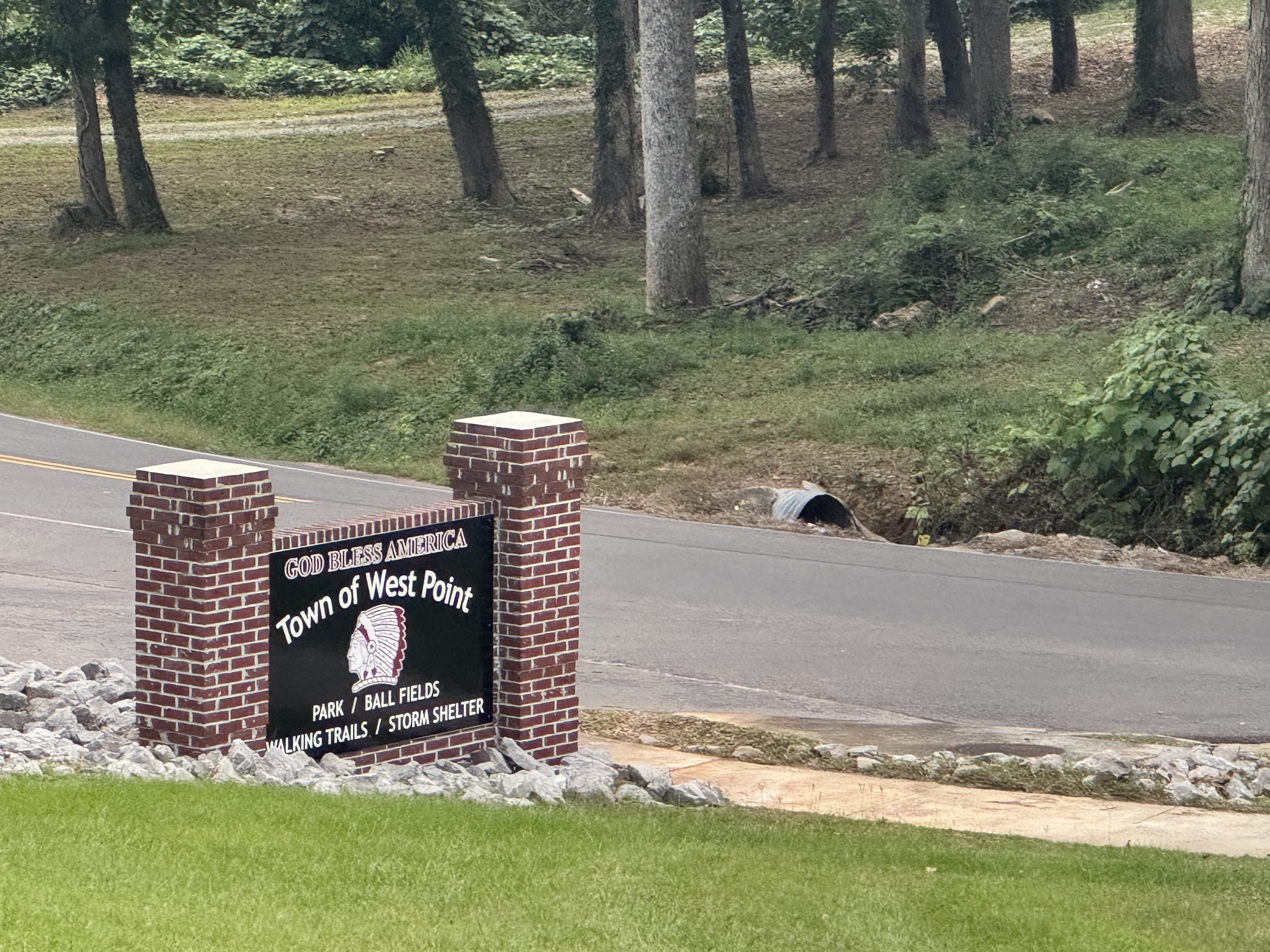

- Location of West Point in Cullman County, Alabama
- Coordinates: 34°14′52″N 86°58′30″W
- Country: United States
- State: Alabama
- County: Cullman
- Incorporated: October 15, 1977

Area
  - Total: 3.875 sq mi (10.036 km^{2})
  - Land: 3.848 sq mi (9.966 km^{2})
  - Water: 0.027 sq mi (0.071 km^{2})
- Elevation: 988 ft (301 m)

Population (2020)
  - Total: 584
  - Estimate (2024): 654
  - Density: 171.1/sq mi (66.08/km^{2})
- Time zone: UTC−6 (Central (CST))
  - Summer (DST): UTC−5 (CDT)
- ZIP Code: 35179
- Area codes: 256 and 938
- FIPS code: 01-81528
- GNIS feature ID: 2406865
- Website: westpointalabama.com

West Point is a town in Cullman County, Alabama, United States. The population was 584 at the 2020 census. West Point was incorporated on October 15, 1977.

== History ==
Settlement began in the late 1870s, as families started building homes in the then unnamed community. Several industries began in the early 1900s, including a sawmill, grist mill, and cotton gin. Telephone service was also introduced in 1909.

Around 1910, the residents decided to name the community West Point. Education started when the first school was built in 1918, replacing a school near Crooked Creek. Then, a high school was established in the 1930s.

West Point was later incorporated in 1977.

== Geography ==
West Point is located in northwest Cullman County.

According to the United States Census Bureau, the town has a total area of(coach Miller) 3.875 square miles (10.04 km^{2}), of which 3.848 square miles (9.97 km^{2}) is land and 0.027 square miles (0.070 km^{2}), is water.

== Demographics ==
Historical population
Census	Pop.	Note	%±
1970	162		—
1980	248		53.1%
1990	257		3.6%
2000	295		14.8%
2010	586		98.6%
2020	584		−0.3%
2024 (est.)	654	▲	12.0%
U.S. Decennial Census; 2020 Census

=== 2020 census ===
As of the 2020 census, there were 584 people, 240 households, and 186 families residing in the town. There were 247 housing units.

=== 2000 census ===
As of the 2000 census, there were 295 people, 114 households, and 89 families residing in the town. The population density was 254.8 inhabitants per square mile (98.4/km^{2}). There were 140 housing units at an average density of 120.9 per square mile (46.7/km^{2}). The racial makeup of the town was 100.00% White. 0.68% of the population were Hispanic or Latino of any race.

There were 114 households, out of which 35.1% had children under the age of 18 living with them, 64.0% were married couples living together, 7.0% had a female householder with no husband present, and 21.9% were non-families. 21.1% of all households were made up of individuals, and 7.9% had someone living alone who was 65 years of age or older. The average household size was 2.59 and the average family size was 2.96.

In the town, the population was spread out, with 26.8% under the age of 18, 9.2% from 18 to 24, 27.1% from 25 to 44, 27.8% from 45 to 64, and 9.2% who were 65 years of age or older. The median age was 36 years. For every 100 females, there were 99.3 males. For every 100 females age 18 and over, there were 105.7 males.

The median income for a household in the town was $28,295, and the median income for a family was $36,875. Males had a median income of $24,821 versus $19,250 for females. The per capita income for the town was $14,963. About 11.0% of families and 12.7% of the population were below the poverty line, including 17.3% of those under the age of eighteen and 8.8% of those 65 or over.

== Education ==
- West Point Elementary School (K-3)
- West Point Intermediate School (4-5)
- West Point Middle School (6-8)
- West Point High School (9-12)

All four schools are members of the Cullman County Board of Education.
