= Birdsong, Alabama =

Unincorporated community in Alabama, United States

- Unincorporated community
- Location within Alabama Location within the United States
- Coordinates: 34°14′42″N 86°38′48″W
- Country: United States
- State: Alabama
- County: Cullman
- Elevation: 879 ft (268 m)
- Time zone: UTC-6 (Central (CST))
  - Summer (DST): UTC-5 (CDT)
- Area codes: 256 & 938
- GNIS feature ID: 114371

Birdsong is an unincorporated community in Cullman County, Alabama, United States.
