= Spring Hill, Cullman County, Alabama =

Unincorporated community in Alabama, United States

Spring Hill, Alabama
- Unincorporated community
- Location within Alabama Location within the United States
- Coordinates: 34°11′40″N 86°57′23″W
- Country: United States
- State: Alabama
- County: Cullman
- Elevation: 971 ft (296 m)
- Time zone: UTC-6 (Central (CST))
  - Summer (DST): UTC-5 (CDT)
- Area codes: 256 & 938
- GNIS feature ID: 127237

Spring Hill is an unincorporated community in Cullman County, Alabama, United States, located on U.S. Route 278, 6.6 miles (10.6 km) west-northwest of Cullman.
