= Joppa, Alabama =

- Census-designated place
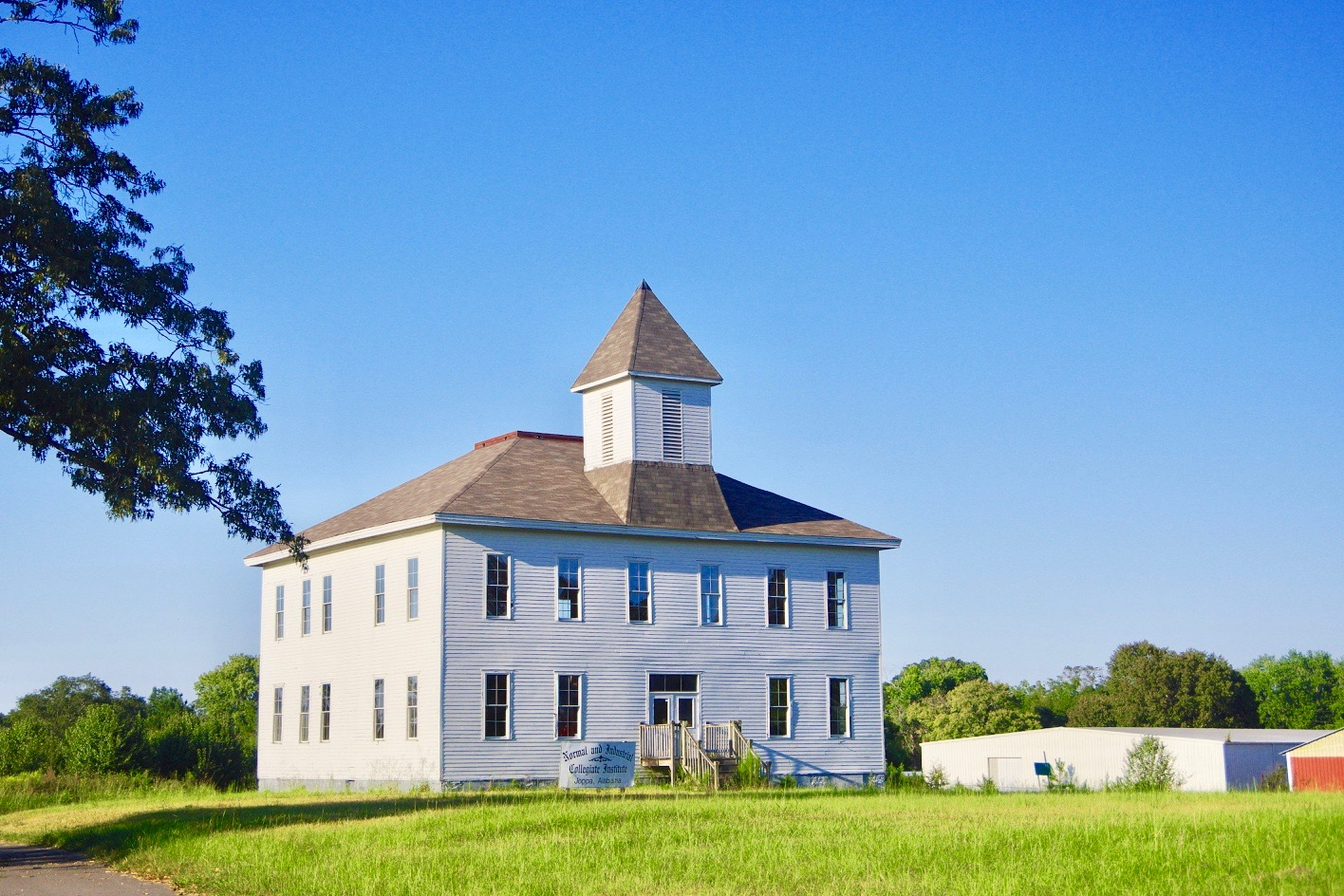
- Reconstructed Joppa Collegiate Normal Institute

- Location in Cullman and Marshall counties, Alabama
- Coordinates: 34°17′52″N 86°33′25″W
- Country: United States
- State: Alabama
- Counties: Cullman, Marshall

Area
  - Total: 1.97 sq mi (5.11 km^{2})
  - Land: 1.95 sq mi (5.04 km^{2})
  - Water: 0.027 sq mi (0.07 km^{2})
- Elevation: 997 ft (304 m)

Population (2020)
  - Total: 556
  - Density: 286/sq mi (110.4/km^{2})
- Time zone: UTC-6 (Central (CST))
  - Summer (DST): UTC-5 (CDT)
- GNIS feature ID: 2628595
- FIPS code: 01-39064

Joppa is a census-designated place (CDP) and unincorporated community in Cullman and Marshall counties, Alabama, United States. As of the 2020 census, its population was 556.

== History ==
Joppa was named after the ancient city of Jaffa.

In the early 20th century, Joppa was an incorporated community within Cullman County and was listed on the U.S. Census from 1900 to 1920. It did not reappear on the census until 2010 when it was made a census-designated place (CDP).

On April 27, 2011, a tornado reportedly hit ground in the Joppa area as part of the 2011 Super Outbreak.

== Geography ==
Joppa is located in northeastern Cullman County. A small portion of the CDP extends north into Marshall County. According to the U.S. Census Bureau, the Joppa CDP has a total area of 2.0 square miles (5.1 km^{2}), of which 1.9 square miles (5.0 km^{2}) are land and 0.039 square miles (0.1 km^{2}), or 1.38%, are water.

Joppa is located along Alabama State Route 69. The city of Arab is 3 miles (5 km) to the northeast, and the town of Baileyton is 4 miles (6 km) to the southwest.

== Demographics ==
Historical population
| Census | Pop. | Note | %± |
|---|---|---|---|
| 1900 | 130 | | — |
| 1910 | 167 | | 28.5% |
| 1920 | 166 | | −0.6% |
| 2010 | 501 | | — |
| 2020 | 556 | | 11.0% |
U.S. Decennial Census

Joppa was listed as a census designated place in the 2010 U.S. census.

Joppa CDP, Alabama – Racial and ethnic composition Note: the US Census treats Hispanic/Latino as an ethnic category. This table excludes Latinos from the racial categories and assigns them to a separate category. Hispanics/Latinos may be of any race.
| Race / Ethnicity (NH = Non-Hispanic) | Pop 2010 | Pop 2020 | % 2010 | % 2020 |
|---|---|---|---|---|
| White alone (NH) | 391 | 446 | 78.04% | 80.22% |
| Black or African American alone (NH) | 1 | 1 | 0.20% | 0.18% |
| Native American or Alaska Native alone (NH) | 4 | 4 | 0.80% | 0.72% |
| Asian alone (NH) | 0 | 0 | 0.00% | 0.00% |
| Native Hawaiian or Pacific Islander alone (NH) | 0 | 0 | 0.00% | 0.00% |
| Other race alone (NH) | 0 | 3 | 0.00% | 0.54% |
| Mixed race or Multiracial (NH) | 19 | 33 | 3.79% | 5.94% |
| Hispanic or Latino (any race) | 86 | 69 | 17.17% | 12.41% |
| Total | 501 | 556 | 100.00% | 100.00% |

== Notable people ==
- Jack Lively, former Major League Baseball pitcher for the Detroit Tigers
