= Iddo, Florida =

Unincorporated community in Florida

Coordinates: 30°16′40.2″N 83°43′30.6″W

Iddo is an unincorporated community in Taylor County, Florida, in the United States. It was named, along with Eridu, Florida, by Atlantic Coast Line Railroad chief engineer J.E. Willoughby.

Iddo is located along US Routes 19 and 27 at the intersections with Luther Wilson Road and then Wilbur Knowles Road. The area has a population of around 1000.
