= Brooklyn, Cullman County, Alabama =

Unincorporated community in Alabama, United States

Brooklyn, Alabama
- Unincorporated community
- Location within Alabama Location within the United States
- Coordinates: 34°13′33″N 86°36′55″W
- Country: United States
- State: Alabama
- County: Cullman
- Elevation: 938 ft (286 m)
- Time zone: UTC-6 (Central (CST))
  - Summer (DST): UTC-5 (CDT)
- Area codes: 256 & 938
- GNIS feature ID: 114958

Brooklyn is an unincorporated community in Cullman County, Alabama, United States, located 2.5 miles (4.0 km) south of Baileyton.
