= Eridu, Florida =

Coordinates: 30°18′07″N 83°44′50″W

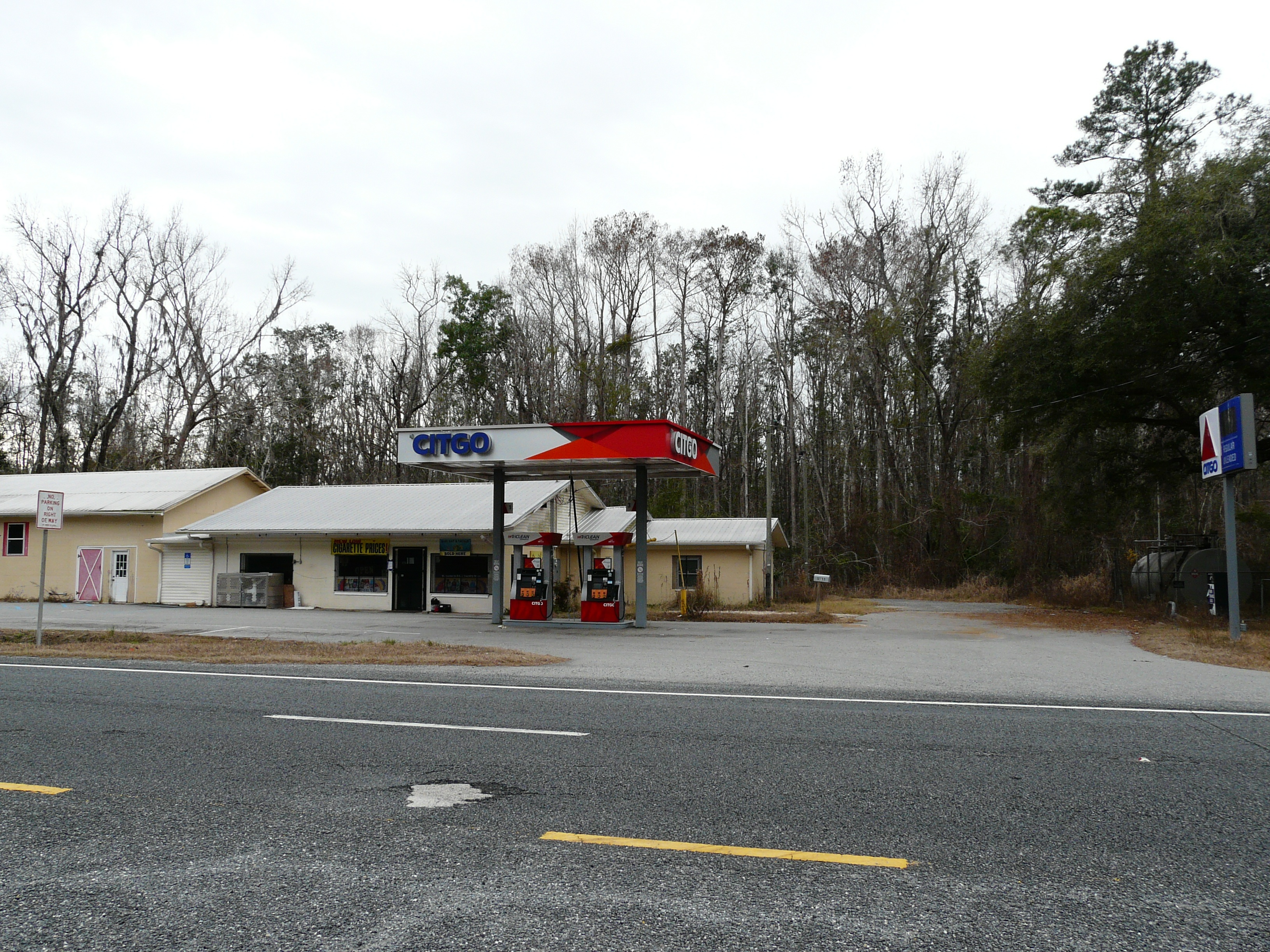
Citgo gas station in Eridu

Eridu is an unincorporated area in Taylor County, Florida and was a rail stop on the Atlantic Coast Line Railroad. It was named after Eridanus, the latin name of the river Po.

Eridu was named by J.E. Willoughby, chief engineer of the Atlantic Coast Line Railroad in 1926. He also named Iddo, Florida. Eridu was a stop along the Atlantic Coast Line Railroad track. The company filed to decommission it in 1940.

Eridu is in northern Taylor County by the Madison County, Florida border. The State of Florida's photo archives include an image of True Sheats cypress furniture from Eridu. The Eridu Baptist Church was organized in the area.
