= Holly Pond, Alabama =

- Town
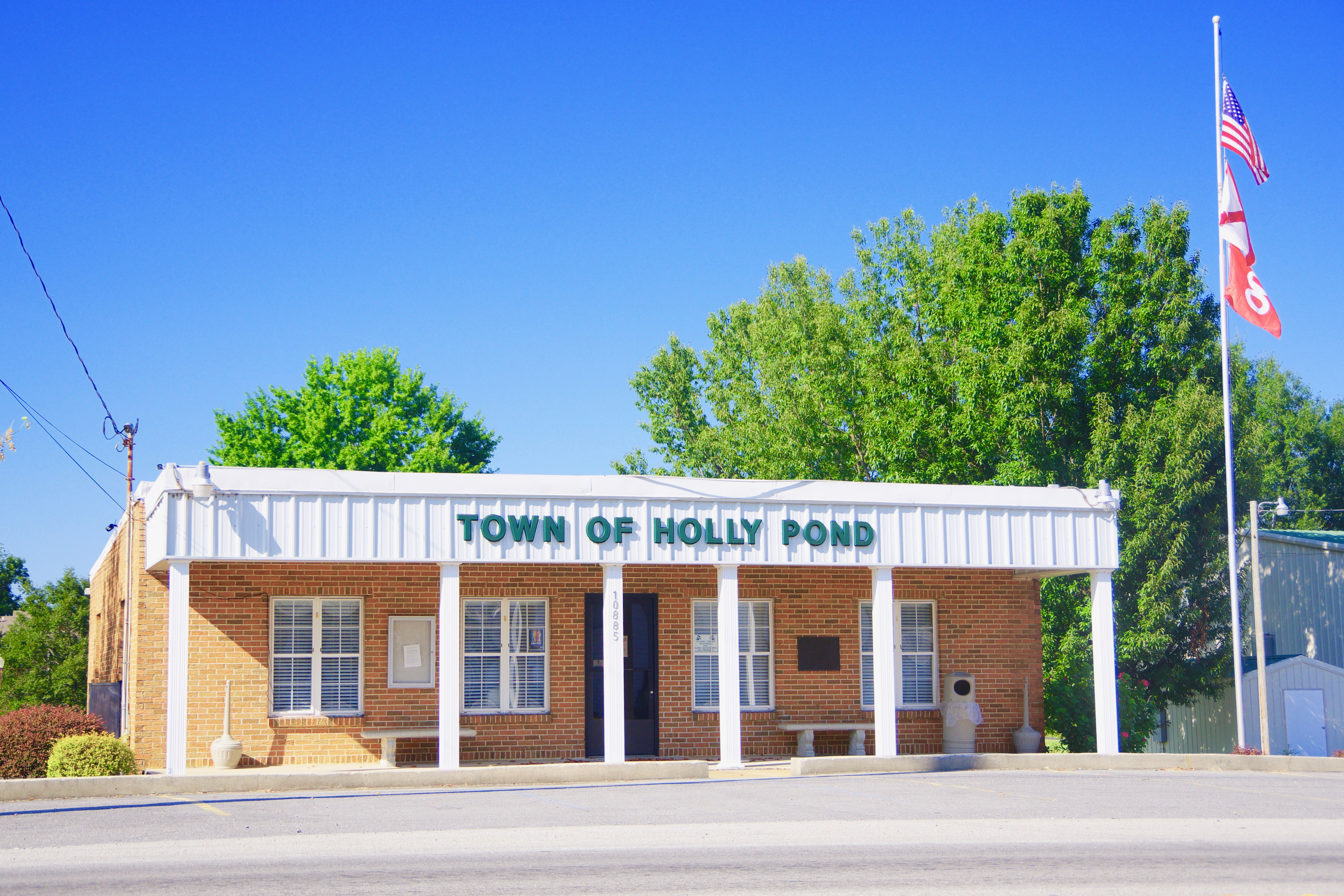
- Town Hall

- Location of Holly Pond in Cullman County, Alabama.
- Coordinates: 34°10′15″N 86°37′23″W
- Country: United States
- State: Alabama
- County: Cullman

Government
  - Mayor: Carla Hart

Area
  - Total: 3.93 sq mi (10.18 km^{2})
  - Land: 3.92 sq mi (10.14 km^{2})
  - Water: 0.015 sq mi (0.04 km^{2})
- Elevation: 853 ft (260 m)

Population (2020)
  - Total: 851
  - Density: 217.4/sq mi (83.95/km^{2})
- Time zone: UTC-6 (Central (CST))
  - Summer (DST): UTC-5 (CDT)
- ZIP code: 35083
- Area code: 256
- FIPS code: 01-35560
- GNIS feature ID: 2405852

Holly Pond is a town in Cullman County, Alabama, United States. As of the 2020 census, Holly Pond had a population of 851. The town was incorporated in 1906.

== History ==
Holly Pond was first settled in the 1840s, and gets its name from two natural ponds that were surrounded by holly trees. The community expanded in the 1850s in anticipation of railroad construction, and by 1888 a post office had been established.

== Geography ==
Holly Pond is located in eastern Cullman County. The town is concentrated around the intersection of U.S. Route 278 and State Route 91. The elevation at the center of town is approximately 870 feet (270 m) above sea level.

According to the U.S. Census Bureau, the town has a total area of 4.4 square miles (11.5 km^{2}), of which 0.019 square miles (0.05 km^{2}), or 0.45%, is water.

== Demographics ==
Historical population
Census	Pop.	Note	%±
1900	144		—
1920	168		—
1930	224		33.3%
1940	226		0.9%
1950	182		−19.5%
1960	193		6.0%
1970	325		68.4%
1980	493		51.7%
1990	602		22.1%
2000	645		7.1%
2010	798		23.7%
2020	851		6.6%
U.S. Decennial Census; 2013 Estimate

=== 2020 census ===
Holly Pond racial composition
Race	Num.	Perc.
White (non-Hispanic)	763	89.66%
Native American	3	0.35%
Asian	2	0.24%
Other/Mixed	36	4.23%
Hispanic or Latino	47	5.52%

As of the 2020 United States census, there were 851 people, 368 households, and 258 families residing in the town.

=== 2000 census ===
As of the census of 2000, there were 645 people, 250 households, and 182 families residing in the town. The population density was 187.3 inhabitants per square mile (72.3/km^{2}). There were 280 housing units at an average density of 81.3 per square mile (31.4/km^{2}). The racial makeup of the town was 97.67% White, 0.47% Native American, 0.16% Asian, 1.40% from other races, and 0.31% from two or more races. 3.41% of the population were Hispanic or Latino of any race.

There were 250 households, out of which 36.4% had children under the age of 18 living with them, 59.2% were married couples living together, 9.2% had a female householder with no husband present, and 26.8% were non-families. 22.8% of all households were made up of individuals, and 11.2% had someone living alone who was 65 years of age or older. The average household size was 2.58 and the average family size was 3.06.

In the town, the population was spread out, with 27.0% under the age of 18, 11.5% from 18 to 24, 31.5% from 25 to 44, 20.2% from 45 to 64, and 9.9% who were 65 years of age or older. The median age was 31 years. For every 100 females, there were 104.8 males. For every 100 females age 18 and over, there were 102.1 males.

The median income for a household in the town was $28,182, and the median income for a family was $31,875. Males had a median income of $27,708 versus $19,432 for females. The per capita income for the town was $13,466. About 12.2% of families and 19.5% of the population were below the poverty line, including 26.9% of those under age 18 and 29.8% of those age 65 or over.

== Education ==
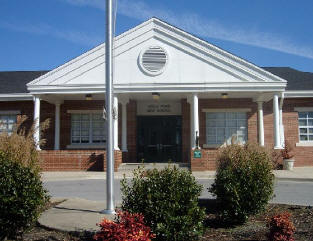
Holly Pond High School

Holly Pond High School is the town's main high school for grades 9–12. As of 2022, enrollment is 338 students. Holly Pond native and 2003 graduate of HPHS, Dr. Nate Ayers, serves as principal. Holly Pond competes in AHSAA Class 2A athletics. The school's mascot is a Bronco.

Holly Pond Middle School is the town's middle school for grades 6–8. It was established in 2008 by the Cullman County Board of Education.

Holly Pond Elementary School is the town's elementary school for grades K-5. The current principal is Karen Sparks.

All schools are part of the Cullman County Schools and have a common campus in central Holly Pond.

== Notable person ==
- Guy Hunt — former Governor of Alabama and Primitive Baptist pastor
