= J.E. Willoughby =

American engineer

Julius Edgar Willoughby (October 13, 1871 – March 11, 1944) was a chief engineer with various railroad companies in the U.S., as well as one in Haiti.

Willoughby was born in Arkadelphia, Alabama, on October 12, 1871. He graduated from the University of Alabama in 1892 and went to work for the Louisville and Nashville Railroad. He rose the ranks at various railroad companies before joining the Louisville and Nashville's Knoxville La Follette & Jellico where he became chief engineer. He also served as chief engineer of the National Railroad of Haiti in 1912 and replaced E.B. Pleasants as chief engineer of the Atlantic Coast Line Railroad in 1913. He is credited with naming Eridu, Florida and Iddo, Florida.

In 1920 he was involved in plans to deepen the canal at Port Tampa.

He was consulted regarding plans for an Atlantic - Gulf of Mexico shipping canal across Florida. He died in Sarasota, Florida.
