= White City, Alabama =

Unincorporated community in Alabama, United States

- Unincorporated community
- Location within Alabama Location within the United States
- Coordinates: 34°05′34″N 86°46′28″W
- Country: United States
- State: Alabama
- County: Cullman
- Elevation: 623 ft (190 m)
- Time zone: UTC-6 (Central (CST))
  - Summer (DST): UTC-5 (CDT)
- Area codes: 256 & 938
- GNIS feature ID: 153959

White City, also known as Centerdale, is an unincorporated community in Cullman County, Alabama, United States, located 2.0 miles (3.2 km) north of Hanceville. White City was damaged by an EF1 tornado on March 14, 2019, that was produced by the March 2019 North American blizzard.
