= East Point, Alabama =

- Census-designated place
- Location of East Point in Cullman County, Alabama.
- Coordinates: 34°10′59″N 86°47′37″W
- Country: United States
- State: Alabama
- County: Cullman

Area
  - Total: 0.98 sq mi (2.54 km^{2})
  - Land: 0.98 sq mi (2.53 km^{2})
  - Water: 0.0077 sq mi (0.02 km^{2})
- Elevation: 810 ft (250 m)

Population (2020)
  - Total: 172
  - Density: 176.4/sq mi (68.11/km^{2})
- Time zone: UTC-6 (Central (CST))
  - Summer (DST): UTC-5 (CDT)
- Area codes: 256 & 938
- GNIS feature ID: 2628588

East Point is a census-designated place and unincorporated community in Cullman County, Alabama, United States. Its population was 172 as of the 2020 census.

== Demographics ==
Historical population
Census	Pop.	Note	%±
2010	201		—
2020	172		−14.4%
U.S. Decennial Census

East Point was listed as a census designated place in the 2010 U.S. census.

East Point CDP, Alabama – Racial and ethnic composition Note: the US Census treats Hispanic/Latino as an ethnic category. This table excludes Latinos from the racial categories and assigns them to a separate category. Hispanics/Latinos may be of any race.
Race / Ethnicity (NH = Non-Hispanic)	Pop 2010	Pop 2020	% 2010	% 2020
White alone (NH)	188	142	93.53%	82.56%
Black or African American alone (NH)	0	0	0.00%	0.00%
Native American or Alaska Native alone (NH)	0	3	0.00%	1.74%
Asian alone (NH)	2	2	1.00%	1.16%
Native Hawaiian or Pacific Islander alone (NH)	0	0	0.00%	0.00%
Other race alone (NH)	1	1	0.50%	0.58%
Mixed race or Multiracial (NH)	3	9	1.49%	5.23%
Hispanic or Latino (any race)	7	15	3.48%	8.72%
Total	201	172	100.00%	100.00%
