= Phelan, Alabama =

Unincorporated community in Alabama, United States

- Unincorporated community
- Location within Alabama Location within the United States
- Coordinates: 34°07′59″N 86°49′02″W
- Country: United States
- State: Alabama
- County: Cullman
- Elevation: 745 ft (227 m)
- Time zone: UTC-6 (Central (CST))
  - Summer (DST): UTC-5 (CDT)
- Area codes: 256 & 938
- GNIS feature ID: 124669

Phelan is an unincorporated community in Cullman County, Alabama, United States. Phelan is located on the former Louisville and Nashville Railroad.

The Southern Express Company provided express mail service to Phelan.

The N. C. Arnold & Son Lumber Company operated a chipping mill in Phelan.
