= Battleground, Alabama =

Unincorporated community in Alabama, United States

- Unincorporated community
- Location of Battleground in Alabama
- Coordinates: 34°18′16″N 86°59′47″W
- Country: United States
- State: Alabama
- County: Cullman
- Elevation: 1,079 ft (329 m)
- Time zone: UTC-6 (Central (CST))
  - Summer (DST): UTC-5 (CDT)
- GNIS feature ID: 159122
- Other names: Battle Ground; Sheatsville

Battleground is an unincorporated community in Cullman County, Alabama, United States.

== Geography ==
Battleground is located at 34°18′16″N 86°59′47″W (34.304543 -86.996397) in the northwestern section of Cullman County, bordering Morgan County. Battleground is 1,079 feet (329 m) above sea level, overlooking the Tennessee Valley. Battleground sits on a hill that a Native American chief named in English Hill of all the battlegrounds.

== History of Battleground ==
The name Battleground was derived from a battle that took place along the Forrest Streight Trail during the Civil War.

One of the historical landmarks in Battleground is Battleground School. Built in 1932, the school was closed in the mid 1990s. Today it is managed and maintained by Camp Liberty located in Battleground. The Battleground School shares land with the Battleground Volunteer Fire Department.

== Local Business and Other Information ==
Battleground has two service stations, Simmions Grocery and Hilltop Grocery. The community is also served by Battleground Screen Printers, Macedonia Baptist Church, and Battleground Volunteer Fire Department and East Battleground Missionary Church, which as of December 2015 was under reconstruction from fire damage.

The largest corporate presence in Battleground is the 75-acre Camp Liberty, a military-themed summer camp.

== Media ==
Battleground's local radio station, B-93 FM, ceased operations on December 27, 2009.
