= Gantts Quarry, Alabama =

- Ghost town
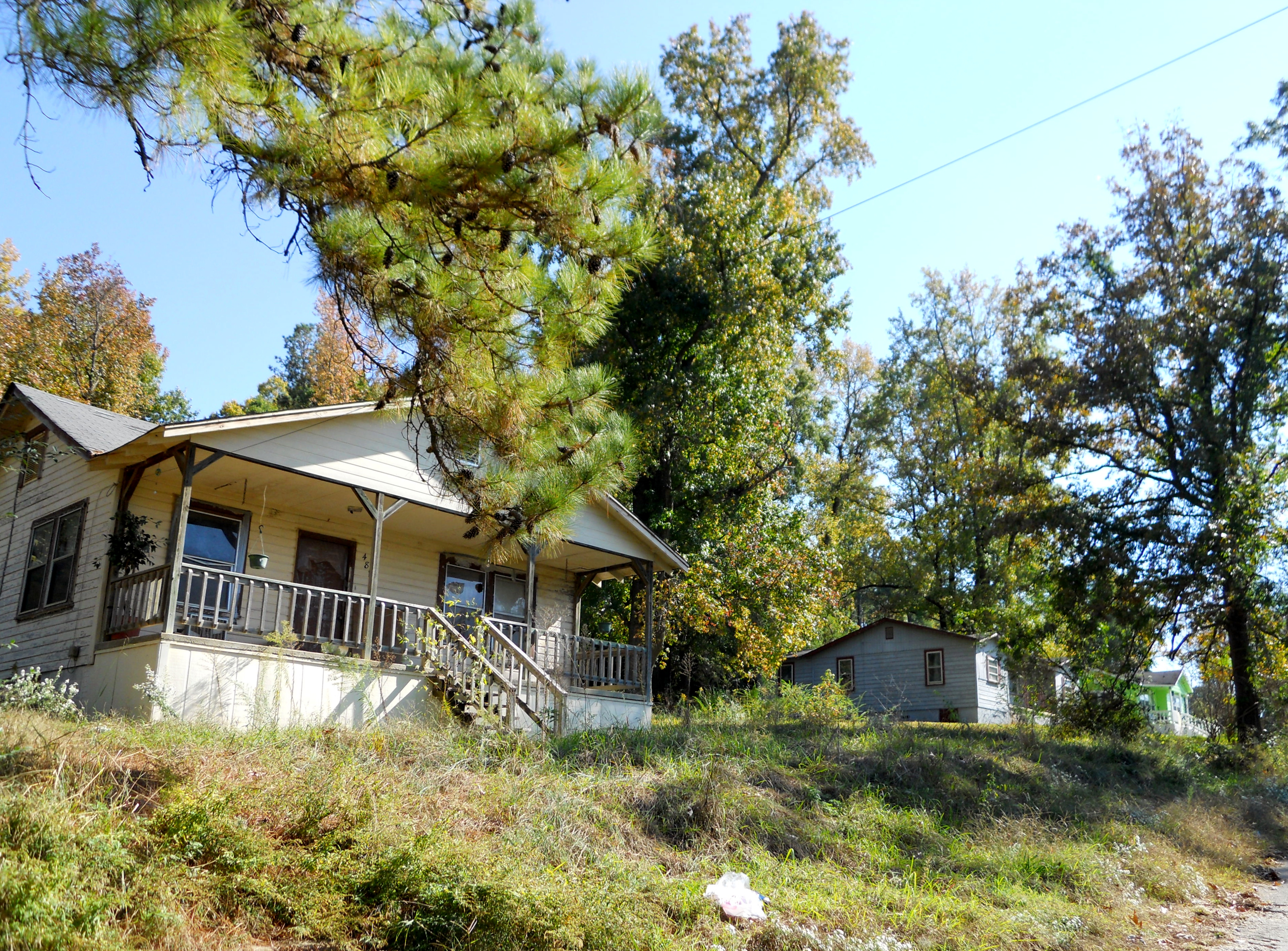
- Abandoned houses in Gantts Quarry

- Location in Talladega County and the state of Alabama
- Coordinates: 33°08′54″N 86°17′22″W
- Country: United States
- State: Alabama
- County: Talladega

Area
  - Total: 0.35 sq mi (0.9 km^{2})
  - Land: 0.35 sq mi (0.9 km^{2})
  - Water: 0 sq mi (0 km^{2})
- Elevation: 633 ft (193 m)

Population (2020)
  - Total: 0
  - Density: 0/sq mi (0/km^{2})
- Time zone: UTC-6 (Central (CST))
  - Summer (DST): UTC-5 (CDT)
- FIPS code: 01-28984
- GNIS feature ID: 0118815

Gantts Quarry is a quarry and ghost town in Talladega County, Alabama, United States. The population was zero at the 2000, 2010, and 2020 censuses, although it had seven residents as late as the 1998 population estimate. Incorporated in 1910 to keep neighboring Sylacauga from annexing it, it was officially disincorporated after its population dwindled to 0 effective 31 December 2001.

== History ==
The history of the town goes back to 1830 when Dr. Edward Gantt discovered white marble and was one of the first towns in the county. A block of marble from the area is in the Washington Monument. The 1930 census showed a population of 542 but the Great Depression and dwindling demand for marble used in building construction began the town's decline. In 1940 the population was 456 and by 1973 it was down to 63 residents. According to the 1990 U.S. Census, the incorporated town of Gantt's Quarry had a population of seven.

When the town was first established, the town was governed by a mayor, a five-member city council, and the odd citizen out served as the town clerk. Company housing was set up for the employees. By the late 1960s, the company that owned the Quarry decided to demolish the company owned houses and this forced the residents to move to other towns and communities.

The town had its own post office, which also served as a library. The post office is pictured below. It was moved from the Quarry to its new location behind the B.B. Comer Museum in Sylacauga. In 2024, the post office was placed on the Alabama Register of Landmarks and Heritage.

By the time of the 2000 census, the town shows a population of zero, and much of it appears to have been annexed into the city of Sylacauga. Preventing such an annexation was most likely the reason the town incorporated in the first place.

== Demographics ==
Historical population
Census	Pop.	Note	%±
1920	413		—
1930	542		31.2%
1940	456		−15.9%
1950	426		−6.6%
1960	238		−44.1%
1970	63		−73.5%
1980	71		12.7%
1990	7		−90.1%
2000	0		−100.0%
2010	0		—
2020	0		—
U.S. Decennial Census

== Geography ==
Gantts Quarry is located at 33°08'54" North, 86°17'22" West (33.152570, −86.28942).

According to the United States Census Bureau, the location has a total area of 0.9 km^{2} (0.3 mi^{2}), all land.

== Gallery ==
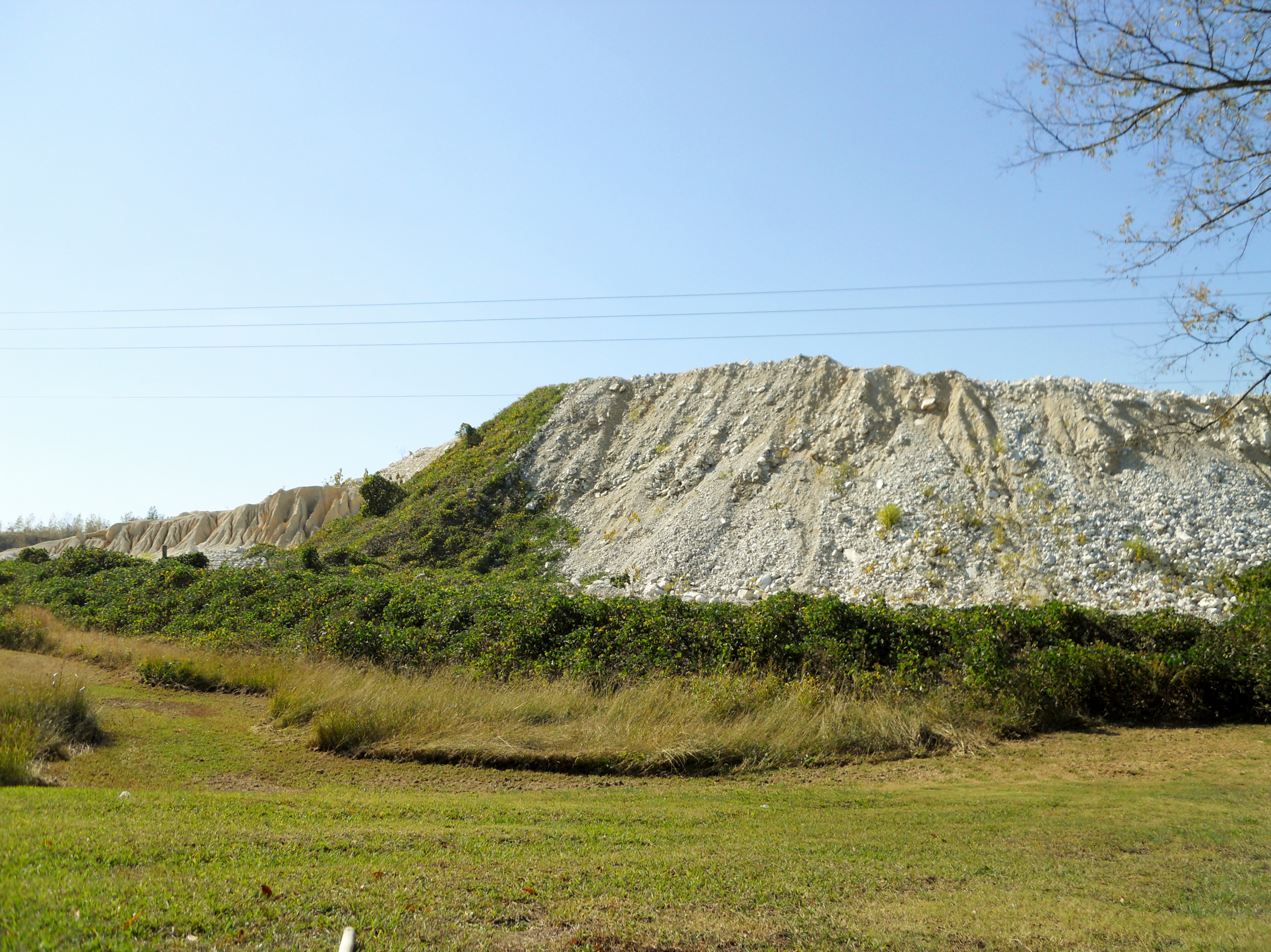
The old marble quarry from which the town derived its name.

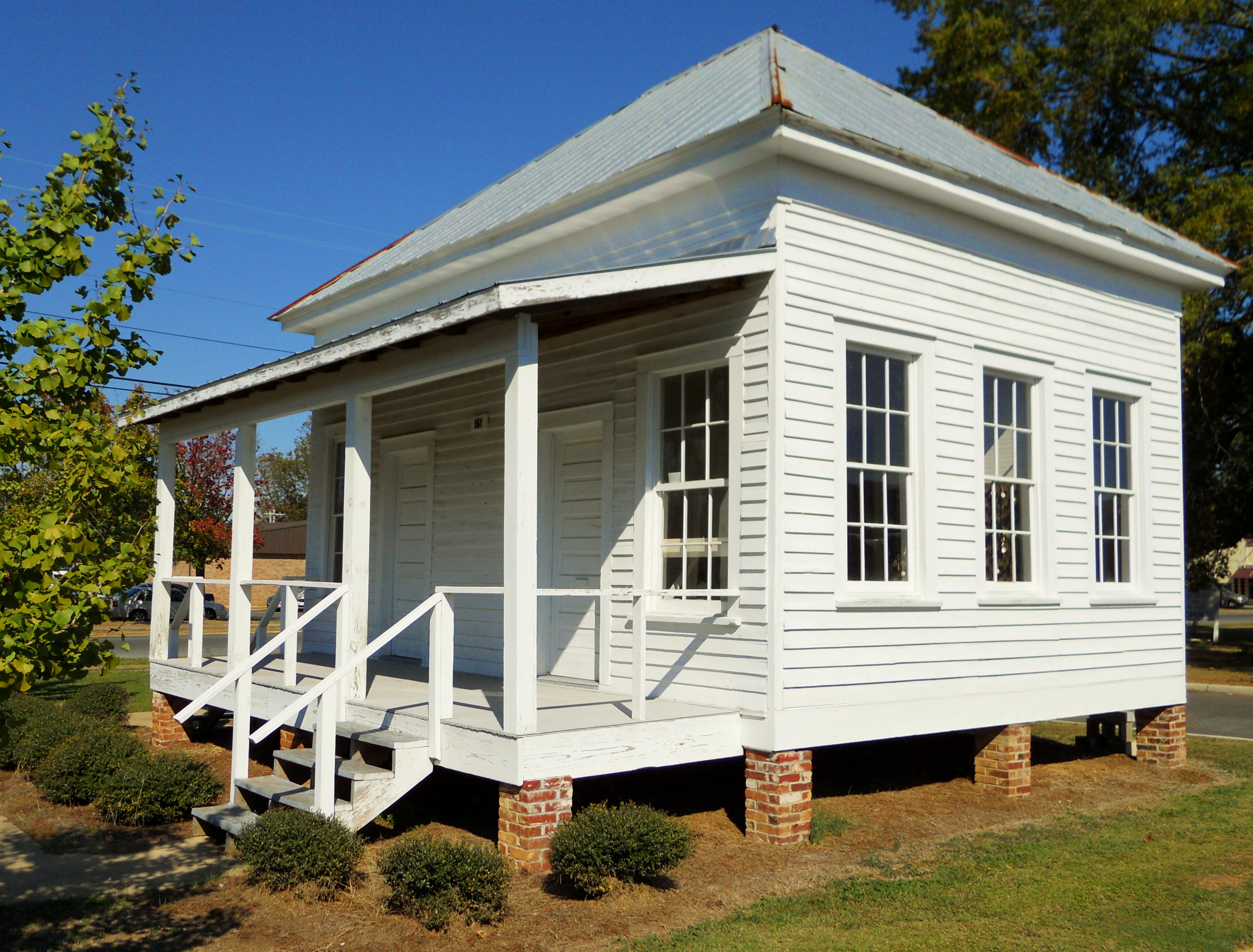
The old Gantts Quarry Post Office was moved to its current location at the corner of N. Norton Ave and W. 8th St. in Sylacauga, Alabama.
