= South Vinemont, Alabama =

- Town
- Location of South Vinemont in Cullman County, Alabama.
- Coordinates: 34°14′08″N 86°51′53″W
- Country: United States
- State: Alabama
- County: Cullman

Area
  - Total: 0.91 sq mi (2.35 km^{2})
  - Land: 0.90 sq mi (2.33 km^{2})
  - Water: 0.0077 sq mi (0.02 km^{2})
- Elevation: 981 ft (299 m)

Population (2020)
  - Total: 558
  - Density: 620.5/sq mi (239.56/km^{2})
- Time zone: UTC-6 (Central (CST))
  - Summer (DST): UTC-5 (CDT)
- FIPS code: 01-71900
- GNIS feature ID: 2407373
- Website: www.townofsouthvinemont.com

South Vinemont is a town in Cullman County, Alabama, United States. As of the 2020 census, South Vinemont had a population of 558.

Initially incorporated as the town of Vinemont in 1961, state officials informed them the name was already taken and so was later changed to South Vinemont. However, the U.S. Census still referred to the town as Vinemont in 1970 and was not acknowledged as South Vinemont until 1980.

== Geography ==
South Vinemont is located in northern Cullman County 4 miles (6 km) north of Cullman, the county seat.

According to the U.S. Census Bureau, South Vinemont has a total area of 0.89 square miles (2.3 km^{2}), of which 0.0077 square miles (0.02 km^{2}), or 1.05%, is water.

== Demographics ==
Historical population
Census	Pop.	Note	%±
1970	480		—
1980	615		28.1%
1990	543		−11.7%
2000	425		−21.7%
2010	749		76.2%
2020	558		−25.5%
U.S. Decennial Census; 2013 Estimate

=== 2020 census ===
South Vinemont racial composition
Race	Num.	Perc.
White (non-Hispanic)	421	75.45%
Black or African American (non-Hispanic)	1	0.18%
Native American	1	0.18%
Asian	4	0.72%
Other/Mixed	30	5.38%
Hispanic or Latino	101	18.1%

As of the 2020 United States census, there were 558 people, 264 households, and 141 families residing in the town.

=== 2000 census ===
As of the census of 2000, there were 425 people, 180 households, and 115 families residing in the town. The population density was 651.6 inhabitants per square mile (251.6/km^{2}). There were 203 housing units at an average density of 311.2 per square mile (120.2/km^{2}). The racial makeup of the town was 94.59% White, 0.47% Black or African American, 1.41% Native American, 0.24% from other races, and 3.29% from two or more races. 4.00% of the population were Hispanic or Latino of any race.

There were 180 households, out of which 25.6% had children under the age of 18 living with them, 52.2% were married couples living together, 6.7% had a female householder with no husband present, and 36.1% were non-families. 31.7% of all households were made up of individuals, and 12.2% had someone living alone who was 65 years of age or older. The average household size was 2.36 and the average family size was 2.93.

In the town, the population was spread out, with 22.1% under the age of 18, 10.4% from 18 to 24, 27.5% from 25 to 44, 25.9% from 45 to 64, and 14.1% who were 65 years of age or older. The median age was 37 years. For every 100 females, there were 90.6 males. For every 100 females age 18 and over, there were 94.7 males.

The median income for a household in the town was $26,806, and the median income for a family was $35,000. Males had a median income of $30,250 versus $16,250 for females. The per capita income for the town was $16,141. About 11.1% of families and 16.5% of the population were below the poverty line, including 10.1% of those under age 18 and 18.2% of those age 65 or over.

== Education ==
Vinemont High School serves 323 students in grades 9-12. Its mascot is an eagle, and the school colors are red, white and blue. Its athletics compete in the State 3A division. It is a part of the Cullman County Board of Education.

== Notable person ==
- Charles "Rusty" Goodman, Southern Gospel singer
