= Cold Springs High School =

Location
- 9010 County Road 109; Bremen, Alabama 35033; United States; 33°58′55″N 87°01′55″W

Information
- Type: Secondary School
- Established: 1937 (89 years ago)
- School district: Cullman County Schools
- CEEB code: 010490
- Principal: Eric Dickerson
- Teaching staff: 14.50 (FTE)
- Grades: 9-12
- Enrollment: 241 (2023-2024)
- Student to teacher ratio: 16.62
- Colors: Royal blue and gold
- Mascot: Eagle
- Newspaper: Eagle Explorer
- Fight song: The Victors
- Website: csh.ccboe.org

Cold Springs High School is a public high school in Bremen, Alabama, United States. They educate students between grades 9-12.
