= Baileyton, Alabama =

- Town
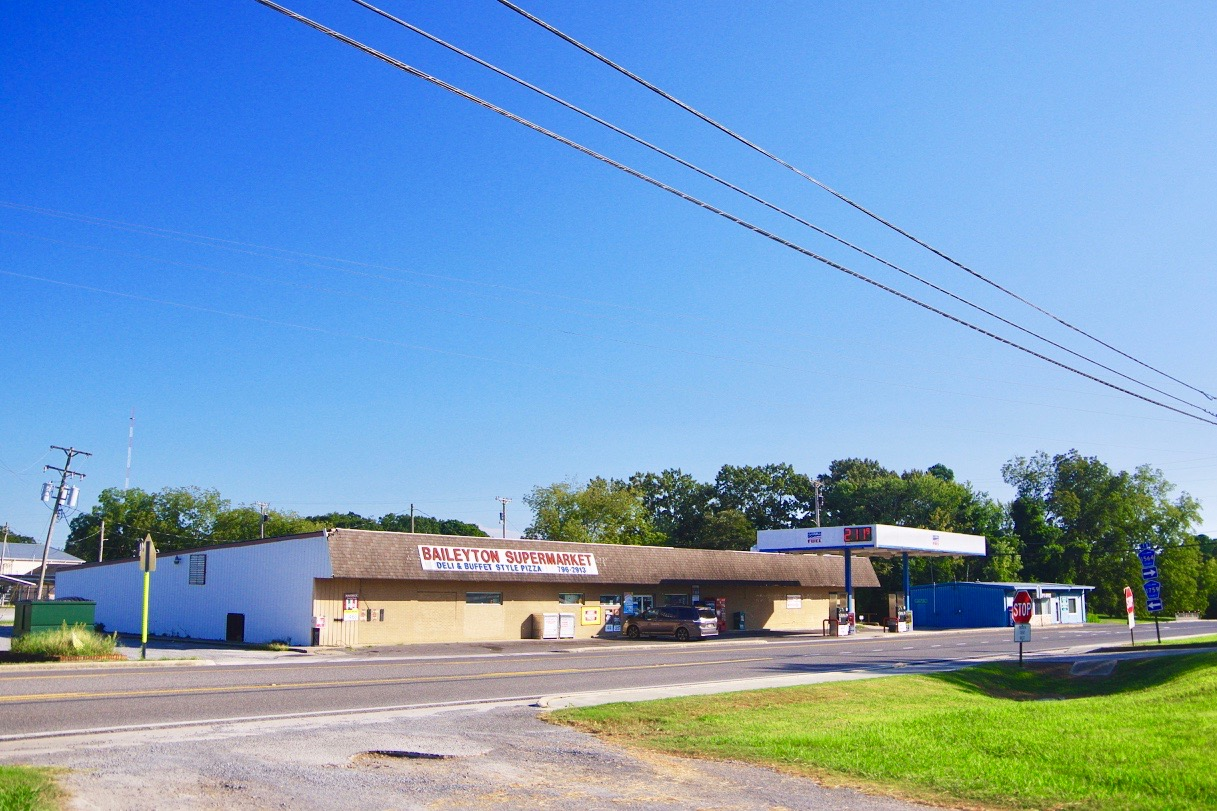
- Baileyton

- Location of Baileyton in Cullman County, Alabama.
- Coordinates: 34°15′25″N 86°37′20″W
- Country: United States
- State: Alabama
- County: Cullman

Government
  - Type: Mayor-Council

Area
  - Total: 5.32 sq mi (13.77 km^{2})
  - Land: 5.25 sq mi (13.61 km^{2})
  - Water: 0.062 sq mi (0.16 km^{2})
- Elevation: 971 ft (296 m)

Population (2020)
  - Total: 649
  - Density: 123.5/sq mi (47.68/km^{2})
- Time zone: UTC-6 (Central (CST))
  - Summer (DST): UTC-5 (CDT)
- ZIP code: 35019
- Area code: 256
- FIPS code: 01-03676
- GNIS feature ID: 2405198

Baileyton is a town in Cullman County, Alabama, United States. At the 2020 census, the population was 649.

The town's mayor is Benny Guthrie.

== History ==
Baileyton was settled in 1870 by Robert Bailey, a farmer from Georgia. A post office was established in Baileyton in 1883. The town was incorporated in 1973.

== Geography ==
Baileyton is located in northeastern Cullman County. The town lies northeast of the city of Cullman along State Route 69, with its municipal boundary reaching northeastward to State Route 67. The town of Fairview lies just to the west along SR 69, and the Joppa community lies opposite SR 67 to the northeast.

According to the U.S. Census Bureau, the town has a total area of 5.3 square miles (13.8 km^{2}), of which 5.3 square miles (13.6 km^{2}) is land and 0.04 square miles (0.1 km^{2}), or 1.06%, is water.

== Demographics ==
Historical population
Census	Pop.	Note	%±
1970	341		—
1980	396		16.1%
1990	352		−11.1%
2000	684		94.3%
2010	610		−10.8%
2020	649		6.4%
U.S. Decennial Census; 2013 Estimate

=== 2000 Census data ===
As of the census of 2000, there were 684 people, 281 households, and 196 families in the town. The population density was 128.6 inhabitants per square mile (49.7/km^{2}). There were 305 housing units at an average density of 57.4 per square mile (22.2/km^{2}). The racial makeup of the town was 99.56% White, 0.29% Native American and 0.15% Asian.

Of the 281 households 32.0% had children under the age of 18 living with them, 56.6% were married couples living together, 8.2% had a female householder with no husband present, and 29.9% were non-families. 27.0% of households were one person and 11.4% were one person aged 65 or older. The average household size was 2.43 and the average family size was 2.93.

The age distribution was 26.6% under the age of 18, 6.1% from 18 to 24, 27.6% from 25 to 44, 26.0% from 45 to 64, and 13.6% 65 or older. The median age was 37 years. For every 100 females, there were 101.2 males. For every 100 females age 18 and over, there were 93.8 males.

The median household income was $31,000 and the median family income was $41,563. Males had a median income of $30,083 versus $20,417 for females. The per capita income for the town was $14,696. About 10.3% of families and 16.6% of the population were below the poverty line, including 21.1% of those under age 18 and 22.5% of those age 65 or over.

=== 2020 Census data ===
Baileyton racial composition
Race	Num.	Perc.
White (non-Hispanic)	598	92.14%
Black or African American (non-Hispanic)	1	0.15%
Native American	2	0.31%
Asian	1	0.15%
Other/Mixed	31	4.78%
Hispanic or Latino	16	2.47%

As of the 2020 United States census, there were 649 people, 325 households, and 226 families residing in the town.
