= Cullman County Schools =

School district in Alabama

Address
- 402 Arnold St Ne Cullman, Alabama, 35055; United States
- Coordinates: 34°6′19.22″N 86°52′43.95″W

District information
- Type: Public
- Grades: PK–12
- Schools: 30
- NCES District ID: 0101020

Students and staff
- Students: 9,901 (2025–2026)
- Teachers: 549.99 (on an FTE basis) (2025–2026)
- Staff: 403.00 (on an FTE basis) (2025–2026)
- Student–teacher ratio: 18.00 (2025–2026)

Other information
- Website: www.ccboe.org

The Cullman County Board of Education is composed of schools that serve Cullman County, Alabama, USA.

== Member schools ==
- Cold Springs Elementary School
- Cold Springs High School
- Fairview Elementary School
- Fairview Middle School
- Fairview High School
- Garden City Elementary School (closed)
- Good Hope Primary School
- Good Hope Elementary School
- Good Hope Middle School
- Good Hope High School
- Hanceville Elementary
- Hanceville Middle School
- Hanceville High School
- Harmony School
- Holly Pond Elementary School
- Holly Pond High School
- Parkside School
- Vinemont Elementary School
- Vinemont Middle School
- Vinemont High School
- Welti Elementary
- West Point Elementary School
- West Point Intermediate
- West Point Middle School
- West Point High School
- C.A.R.E (Children At Risk Education Alternative School)
- Cullman Area Technology Academy
- Fast Track for Industry
- Child Development Center
