= Beaverdale, Iowa =

Beaverdale, Iowa may refer to two places.

- Beaverdale, Des Moines County, Iowa, a census-designated place near the city of Burlington
- Beaverdale, Polk County, Iowa, a neighborhood in the city of Des Moines
