= Beaverdale, Georgia =

Coordinates: 34°55′16″N 84°50′33″W

- unincorporated community
- Location within Georgia
- Country: United States
- State: Georgia
- County: Whitfield
- Elevation: 719 ft (219 m)
- Time zone: UTC-5 (Eastern (EST))
  - Summer (DST): UTC-4 (EDT)
- ZIP code: 30710
- GNIS feature ID: 331120

Beaverdale is an unincorporated community in Whitfield County, in the U.S. state of Georgia.

== History ==
The community was named after the North American beaver. A post office called Beaverdale was established in 1873, and remained in operation until 1909. In 1900, the community had 60 inhabitants.
