= Fairview, Alabama =

Fairview
- Town
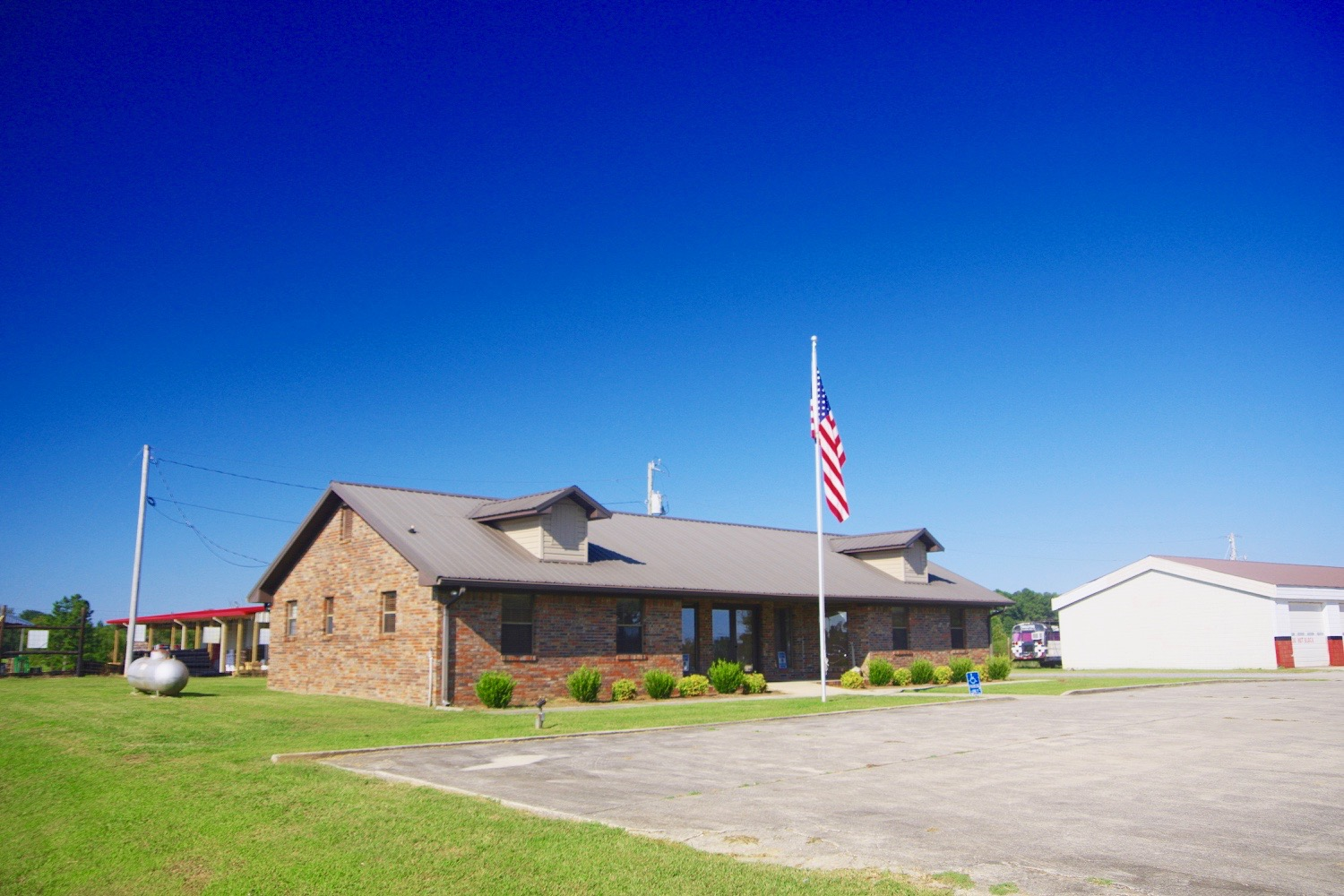
- Town Hall

- Location of Fairview in Cullman County, Alabama.
- Coordinates: 34°15′12″N 86°41′07″W
- Country: United States
- State: Alabama
- County: Cullman

Government
  - Mayor: Clinton Haynes

Area
  - Total: 1.98 sq mi (5.13 km^{2})
  - Land: 1.97 sq mi (5.09 km^{2})
  - Water: 0.012 sq mi (0.03 km^{2})
- Elevation: 938 ft (286 m)

Population (2020)
  - Total: 543
  - Density: 276.1/sq mi (106.61/km^{2})
- Time zone: UTC-6 (Central (CST))
  - Summer (DST): UTC-5 (CDT)
- zip code: 35058
- FIPS code: 01-25384
- GNIS feature ID: 2406480

Fairview is a town in Cullman County, Alabama, United States. As of the 2020 census, Fairview had a population of 543. It incorporated in 1968.

== History ==
Settled in the 1840s, what is now Fairview was originally known as "Lawrence Chapel." The town began using its current name, after a local Methodist church, in the 1890s. By the early 1900s, the town was home to several mills and a popular resort hotel. The first high school was completed in 1923.

== Geography ==
Fairview is located in northeastern Cullman County. It lies along State Route 69 between Cullman to the west and Arab to the east.

According to the U.S. Census Bureau, the town has a total area of 2.7 square miles (7.1 km^{2}), of which 0.015 square miles (0.04 km^{2}), or 0.57%, is water.

== Demographics ==
Historical population
Census	Pop.	Note	%±
1970	313		—
1980	450		43.8%
1990	383		−14.9%
2000	522		36.3%
2010	446		−14.6%
2020	543		21.7%
U.S. Decennial Census; 2013 Estimate

As of the census of 2000, there were 522 people, 188 households, and 144 families residing in the town. The population density was 212.1 inhabitants per square mile (81.9/km^{2}). There were 198 housing units at an average density of 80.4 per square mile (31.0/km^{2}). The racial makeup of the town was 86.59% White, 0.77% Native American, 0.19% Asian, 7.28% from other races, and 5.17% from two or more races. 16.28% of the population were Hispanic or Latino of any race.

There were 188 households, out of which 36.7% had children under the age of 18 living with them, 57.4% were married couples living together, 8.0% had a female householder with no husband present, and 23.4% were non-families. 20.7% of all households were made up of individuals, and 11.7% had someone living alone who was 65 years of age or older. The average household size was 2.78 and the average family size was 3.06.

In the town, the population was spread out, with 23.4% under the age of 18, 13.8% from 18 to 24, 30.5% from 25 to 44, 17.6% from 45 to 64, and 14.8% who were 65 years of age or older. The median age was 33 years. For every 100 females, there were 125.0 males. For every 100 females age 18 and over, there were 126.0 males.

The median income for a household in the town was $31,875, and the median income for a family was $37,500. Males had a median income of $21,944 versus $21,042 for females. The per capita income for the town was $13,817. About 13.0% of families and 14.8% of the population were below the poverty line, including 26.0% of those under age 18 and 11.6% of those age 65 or over.

=== 2020 census ===
Fairview racial composition
Race	Num.	Perc.
White (non-Hispanic)	448	82.50%
Black or African American (non-Hispanic)	2	0.37%
Asian	9	1.66%
Native American	4	0.74%
Other/Mixed	80	14.73%

As of the 2020 United States census, there were 543 people, 213 households, and 168 families residing in the city.

== Education ==
- Fairview Elementary School (K-5)
- Fairview Middle School (6–8)
- Fairview High School (9–12)

All three schools are members of the Cullman County Board of Education.

== In popular culture ==
In 2004, the dramatic film Lightning Bug was shot on location in Fairview.
