= Good Hope, Alabama =

City in Alabama, United States

- City
- City of Good Hope
- Flag Seal

- Location of Good Hope in Cullman County, Alabama.
- Coordinates: 34°07′21″N 86°52′31″W
- Country: United States
- State: Alabama
- County: Cullman

Area
  - Total: 7.90 sq mi (20.45 km^{2})
  - Land: 7.85 sq mi (20.32 km^{2})
  - Water: 0.046 sq mi (0.12 km^{2})
- Elevation: 669 ft (204 m)

Population (2020)
  - Total: 2,483
  - Density: 316.4/sq mi (122.17/km^{2})
- Time zone: UTC-6 (Central (CST))
  - Summer (DST): UTC-5 (CDT)
- ZIP code: 35055, 35057
- Area codes: 256 and 938
- FIPS code: 01-30496
- GNIS feature ID: 2406587
- Website: goodhopeal.com

Good Hope is a city in Cullman County, Alabama, United States. As of the 2020 census, Good Hope had a population of 2,483. It incorporated in April 1962.

== Geography ==
Good Hope is located near the center of Cullman County. It is bordered by Cullman, the county seat, to the northeast. Interstate 65 passes through the city, with access from Exit 304. I-65 leads south 45 miles (72 km) to Birmingham and north 57 miles (92 km) (via Interstate 565) to Huntsville.

According to the U.S. Census Bureau, Good Hope has a total area of 8.0 square miles (20.7 km^{2}), of which 8.0 square miles (20.6 km^{2}) is land and 0.04 square miles (0.1 km^{2}), or 0.59%, is water.

== Demographics ==
Historical population
Census	Pop.	Note	%±
1970	840		—
1980	1,442		71.7%
1990	1,700		17.9%
2000	1,966		15.6%
2010	2,264		15.2%
2020	2,483		9.7%
U.S. Decennial Census; 2013 Estimate

=== Racial and ethnic composition ===
Good Hope city, Alabama – Racial and ethnic composition Note: the US Census treats Hispanic/Latino as an ethnic category. This table excludes Latinos from the racial categories and assigns them to a separate category. Hispanics/Latinos may be of any race. Race and ethnicity was not surveyed for populations under 2,500 in the 1980 census and under 1,000 in 1990 census.
Race / Ethnicity (NH = Non-Hispanic)	Pop 1990	Pop 2000	Pop 2010	Pop 2020	% 1990	% 2000	% 2010	% 2020
White alone (NH)	1,692	1,930	2,057	2,070	99.53%	98.17%	90.86%	83.37%
Black or African American alone (NH)	2	2	3	17	0.12%	0.10%	0.13%	0.68%
Native American or Alaska Native alone (NH)	4	4	8	7	0.24%	0.20%	0.35%	0.28%
Asian alone (NH)	0	2	11	13	0.00%	0.10%	0.49%	0.52%
Native Hawaiian or Pacific Islander alone (NH)	x	0	0	20	x	0.00%	0.00%	0.81%
Other race alone (NH)	0	0	0	1	0.00%	0.00%	0.00%	0.04%
Mixed race or Multiracial (NH)	x	6	11	110	x	0.31%	0.49%	4.43%
Hispanic or Latino (any race)	2	22	174	245	0.12%	1.12%	7.69%	9.87%
Total	1,700	1,966	2,264	2,483	100.00%	100.00%	100.00%	100.00%

=== 2020 census ===
As of the 2020 census, there were 2,483 people and 604 families residing in the city. The median age was 36.3 years. 26.3% of residents were under the age of 18 and 14.5% were 65 years of age or older. For every 100 females there were 94.1 males, and for every 100 females age 18 and over there were 91.5 males age 18 and over.

62.3% of residents lived in urban areas, while 37.7% lived in rural areas.

There were 925 households in Good Hope, of which 36.3% had children under the age of 18 living in them. Of all households, 51.9% were married-couple households, 16.8% were households with a male householder and no spouse or partner present, and 26.8% were households with a female householder and no spouse or partner present. About 24.3% of all households were made up of individuals and 10.9% had someone living alone who was 65 years of age or older. There were 1,007 housing units, of which 8.1% were vacant. The homeowner vacancy rate was 2.3% and the rental vacancy rate was 6.6%.

=== 2010 census ===
At the 2010 census there were 2,264 people, 847 households, and 631 families living in the town. The population density was 285 inhabitants per square mile (110/km^{2}). There were 932 housing units at an average density of 116.5 per square mile (45.0/km^{2}). The racial makeup of the city was 92.7% White, 0.3% Black or African American, 0.4% Native American, 0.5% Asian, 5.2% from other races, and 1.1% from two or more races. 7.7% of the population were Hispanic or Latino of any race. Of the 847 households 34.2% had children under the age of 18 living with them, 57.3% were married couples living together, 12.4% had a female householder with no husband present, and 25.5% were non-families. 22.2% of households were one person and 8.1% were one person aged 65 or older. The average household size was 2.67 and the average family size was 3.12.

The age distribution was 26.9% under the age of 18, 8.5% from 18 to 24, 26.9% from 25 to 44, 24.6% from 45 to 64, and 13.1% 65 or older. The median age was 36.5 years. For every 100 females, there were 101.2 males. For every 100 females age 18 and over, there were 100.0 males.

The median household income was $45,784 and the median family income was $48,080. Males had a median income of $50,750 versus $27,865 for females. The per capita income for the city was $22,771. 19.3% of the population and 13.7% of families were below the poverty line. 29.7% of those under the age of 18 and 21.4% of those 65 and older were living below the poverty line.

=== 2000 census ===
At the 2000 census there were 1,966 people, 764 households, and 583 families living in the city. The population density was 265.0 inhabitants per square mile (102.3/km^{2}). There were 864 housing units at an average density of 116.5 per square mile (45.0/km^{2}). The racial makeup of the city was 98.83% White, 0.10% Black or African American, 0.20% Native American, 0.15% Asian, 0.31% from other races, and 0.41% from two or more races. 1.12% of the population were Hispanic or Latino of any race. Of the 764 households 35.5% had children under the age of 18 living with them, 62.2% were married couples living together, 11.0% had a female householder with no husband present, and 23.6% were non-families. 20.8% of households were one person and 6.3% were one person aged 65 or older. The average household size was 2.57 and the average family size was 2.98.

The age distribution was 25.6% under the age of 18, 9.7% from 18 to 24, 30.7% from 25 to 44, 22.6% from 45 to 64, and 11.3% 65 or older. The median age was 35 years. For every 100 females, there were 96.8 males. For every 100 females age 18 and over, there were 95.7 males.

The median household income was $33,274 and the median family income was $39,063. Males had a median income of $25,809 versus $20,762 for females. The per capita income for the city was $16,602. 7.0% of the population and 5.1% of families were below the poverty line. 5.7% of those under the age of 18 and 13.9% of those 65 and older were living below the poverty line.

== Education ==
- Good Hope Primary School- Grades PK-2.
- Good Hope Elementary School- Grades 3–5.
- Good Hope Middle School- Grades 6–8.
- Good Hope High School- serves 395 students in grades 9–12. Its mascot is the Raiders, and its school colors are red and white. Its sports teams are part of the Alabama High School Athletic Association Class 4A.

All four schools are members of the Cullman County Board of Education.
