= Cullman County, Alabama =

County in Alabama, United States

- County
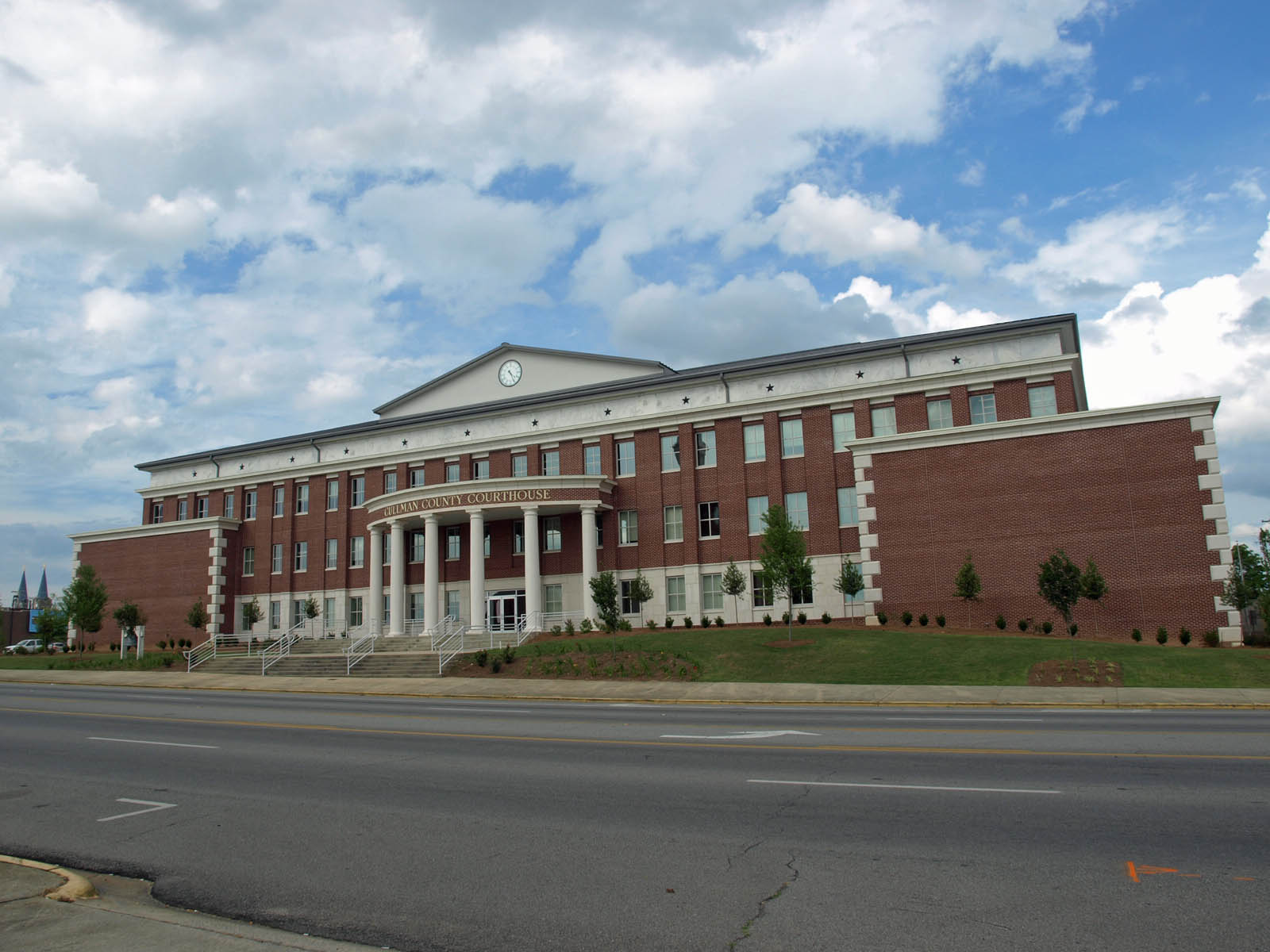
- Cullman County Courthouse in Cullman

- Seal Logo

- Location within the U.S. state of Alabama
- Coordinates: 34°08′00″N 86°52′00″W
- Country: United States
- State: Alabama
- Founded: January 24, 1877
- Named for: John G. Cullmann
- Seat: Cullman
- Largest city: Cullman

Area
  - Total: 755 sq mi (1,960 km^{2})
  - Land: 735 sq mi (1,900 km^{2})
  - Water: 20 sq mi (52 km^{2}) 2.7%

Population (2020)
  - Total: 87,866
  - Estimate (2025): 94,009 ▲
  - Density: 120/sq mi (46.2/km^{2})
- Time zone: UTC−6 (Central)
  - Summer (DST): UTC−5 (CDT)
- Congressional district: 4th
- Website: www.co.cullman.al.us
- County Number 25 on Alabama Licence Plates

Cullman County is a county located in the north central portion of the U.S. state of Alabama. As of the 2020 census, the population was 87,866. Its county seat and largest city is Cullman. Its name is in honor of Colonel John G. Cullmann.

Cullman County comprises the Cullman, AL Micropolitan Statistical Area, which is a component of the Birmingham-Hoover-Talladega, AL Combined Statistical Area.

It is served by TV stations and FM radio stations from both Huntsville and Birmingham and is part of the designated market area, or "DMA," of Birmingham. Cullman is a "moist" county in terms of availability of alcoholic beverages; the cities of Cullman, Good Hope, and Hanceville allow sale of alcohol and are "wet" and the rest of the county is dry.

== History ==
This area was inhabited for thousands of years by varying cultures of indigenous peoples. The historic Cherokee and Choctaw lived here at the time of European encounter, with the Cherokee moving in after the American Revolutionary War and in response to pressures from northern areas. Their settlements in Alabama were known as the Lower Towns.

People claiming descent from Cherokee who remained in the county after Indian Removal in the 1830s, organized as the "Echota Cherokee Tribe of Alabama" in the 1980s. The tribe was recognized by the state in 1984 but is not federally recognized. It claims 22,000 members in the state, mostly in northern Alabama.

Cullman County was organized on January 24, 1877 from Blount, Morgan, and Winston counties. The act of establishment named March 6, 1877, as the day that residents would select the location of their county seat. The election pitted two towns, Cullman and Milner against each other. In the March 1877 election, Cullman defeated its rival and became the county seat, 760 votes to 55.

On April 27, 2011, Cullman was hit by the 2011 Cullman tornado, which took place during the 2011 Super Outbreak.

== Geography ==
According to the United States Census Bureau, the county has a total area of 755 square miles (1,960 km^{2}), of which 735 square miles (1,900 km^{2}) is land and 20 square miles (52 km^{2}) (2.7%) is water.

=== Adjacent counties ===
- Morgan County (north)
- Marshall County (northeast)
- Blount County (east)
- Walker County (southwest)
- Winston County (west)
- Lawrence County (northwest)

== Transportation ==
=== Major highways ===
- Interstate 65
- U.S. Highway 31 / State Route 3 (unsigned)
- U.S. Highway 231 / State Route 53 (unsigned)
- U.S. Highway 278 / State Route 74 (unsigned)
- State Route 67
- State Route 69
- State Route 91
- State Route 157

=== Rail ===
- CSX Transportation

== Demographics ==
Historical population
Census	Pop.	Note	%±
1880	6,355		—
1890	13,439		111.5%
1900	17,849		32.8%
1910	28,321		58.7%
1920	33,034		16.6%
1930	41,051		24.3%
1940	47,343		15.3%
1950	49,046		3.6%
1960	45,572		−7.1%
1970	52,445		15.1%
1980	61,642		17.5%
1990	67,613		9.7%
2000	77,483		14.6%
2010	80,406		3.8%
2020	87,866		9.3%
2025 (est.)	94,009	▲	7.0%
U.S. Decennial Census; 1790–1960 1900–1990; 1990–2000 2010–2020

=== 2020 census ===
Cullman County, Alabama – Racial and ethnic composition Note: the US Census treats Hispanic/Latino as an ethnic category. This table excludes Latinos from the racial categories and assigns them to a separate category. Hispanics/Latinos may be of any race.
Race / Ethnicity (NH = Non-Hispanic)	Pop 2000	Pop 2010	Pop 2020	% 2000	% 2010	% 2020
White alone (NH)	73,940	74,568	78,298	95.43%	92.74%	89.11%
Black or African American alone (NH)	726	821	914	0.94%	1.02%	1.04%
Native American or Alaska Native alone (NH)	277	397	287	0.36%	0.49%	0.33%
Asian alone (NH)	136	339	522	0.18%	0.42%	0.59%
Pacific Islander alone (NH)	26	18	64	0.03%	0.02%	0.07%
Other race alone (NH)	22	41	151	0.03%	0.05%	0.17%
Mixed race or Multiracial (NH)	668	768	3,484	0.86%	0.96%	3.97%
Hispanic or Latino (any race)	1,688	3,454	4,146	2.18%	4.30%	4.72%
Total	77,483	80,406	87,866	100.00%	100.00%	100.00%

As of the 2020 census, the county had a population of 87,866. The median age was 41.3 years. 22.3% of residents were under the age of 18 and 18.9% of residents were 65 years of age or older. For every 100 females there were 97.0 males, and for every 100 females age 18 and over there were 95.0 males age 18 and over.

The racial makeup of the county was 90.1% White, 1.1% Black or African American, 0.5% American Indian and Alaska Native, 0.6% Asian, 0.1% Native Hawaiian and Pacific Islander, 2.4% from some other race, and 5.3% from two or more races. Hispanic or Latino residents of any race comprised 4.7% of the population.

24.4% of residents lived in urban areas, while 75.6% lived in rural areas.

There were 34,723 households in the county, of which 30.0% had children under the age of 18 living with them and 24.8% had a female householder with no spouse or partner present. About 26.6% of all households were made up of individuals and 12.1% had someone living alone who was 65 years of age or older.

There were 39,145 housing units, of which 11.3% were vacant. Among occupied housing units, 74.2% were owner-occupied and 25.8% were renter-occupied. The homeowner vacancy rate was 1.5% and the rental vacancy rate was 6.4%.

=== 2010 census ===
As of the census of 2010, there were 80,406 people, 31,864 households, and 22,487 families living in the county. The population density was 109 people per square mile (42 people/km^{2}). There were 37,054 housing units at an average density of 49 units per square mile (19 units/km^{2}). The racial makeup of the county was 94.7% White, 1.1% Black or African American, 0.5% Native American, 0.4% Asian, 0.0% Pacific Islander, 2.2% from other races, and 1.1% from two or more races. 4.3% of the population were Hispanic or Latino of any race.

There were 31,864 households, out of which 28.0% had children under the age of 18 living with them, 55.2% were married couples living together, 10.4% had a female householder with no husband present, and 29.4% were non-families. 25.7% of all households were made up of individuals, and 11.0% had someone living alone who was 65 years of age or older. The average household size was 2.49 and the average family size was 2.98.

In the county, the population was spread out, with 23.2% under the age of 18, 8.6% from 18 to 24, 24.8% from 25 to 44, 27.5% from 45 to 64, and 15.9% who were 65 years of age or older. The median age was 39.9 years. For every 100 females, there were 97.6 males. For every 100 females age 18 and over, there were 100.9 males.

The median income for a household in the county was $38,567, and the median income for a family was $47,771. Males had a median income of $36,952 versus $27,979 for females. The per capita income for the county was $20,284. About 12.8% of families and 16.7% of the population were below the poverty line, including 21.6% of those under age 18 and 12.6% of those age 65 or over.

=== 2000 census ===
As of the census of 2000, there were 77,483 people, 30,706 households, and 22,476 families living in the county. The population density was 105 people per square mile (41 people/km^{2}). There were 35,233 housing units at an average density of 48 units per square mile (19 units/km^{2}). The racial makeup of the county was 96.81% White, 0.96% Black or African American, 0.37% Native American, 0.18% Asian, 0.03% Pacific Islander, 0.62% from other races, and 1.03% from two or more races. 2.18% of the population were Hispanic or Latino of any race.

There were 30,706 households, out of which 32.10% had children under the age of 18 living with them, 60.80% were married couples living together, 8.70% had a female householder with no husband present, and 26.80% were non-families. 24.00% of all households were made up of individuals, and 10.40% had someone living alone who was 65 years of age or older. The average household size was 2.49 and the average family size was 2.94.

In the county, the population was spread out, with 24.30% under the age of 18, 8.80% from 18 to 24, 28.30% from 25 to 44, 24.00% from 45 to 64, and 14.60% who were 65 years of age or older. The median age was 38 years. For every 100 females, there were 97.30 males. For every 100 females age 18 and over, there were 94.20 males.

The median income for a household in the county was $32,256, and the median income for a family was $39,341. Males had a median income of $30,444 versus $20,436 for females. The per capita income for the county was $16,922. About 9.50% of families and 13.00% of the population were below the poverty line, including 14.50% of those under age 18 and 16.80% of those age 65 or over.

== Education ==
Public education in Cullman County is provided by three systems: the Cullman City Schools, Arab City Schools, and the Cullman County Schools, which includes unincorporated areas and in all municipalities except the cities of Arab and (the vast majority of) Cullman.

- Cullman High School - under the governance of the Cullman City School Board

Private educational institutions in the county include:

- Christ Covenant School - located in Cullman (Grades K-2)
- Cullman Christian School - located in Cullman (Grades K-12)
- Sacred Heart of Jesus Catholic Elementary School - located in Cullman (Grades PreK-6)
- St. Bernard Preparatory School - located in Cullman (Grades 7–12)
- St. Paul's Lutheran School - located in Cullman (Grades K-6)
- Vinemont Christian Academy - located in South Vinemont (Grades PreK-12)

Cullman is also the home of Wallace State Community College in Hanceville. It was named for the former Governor of Alabama, George C. Wallace. The public, non-profit college opened its doors in 1966 and has grown to become the third largest community college in the state of Alabama, with an enrollment of around 6,000 students. The college is accredited by the Southern Association of Colleges and Schools Commission on Colleges to award degrees. Many programs have additional accreditation from organizations appropriate to the particular disciplines. Wallace State offers hundreds of degree and certificate options in dozens of programs in its Academic, Health and Technical Divisions. The college offers more Health programs than any other community college in the state. The college offers early enrollment through its Dual Enrollment, Fast Track Academy and Fast Track for Industry programs, the latter of which is funded through grants that allow free tuition for qualified students entering the technical, academic and health programs included in the program. The college's current president is Dr. Vicki P. Karolewics, who is the institution's third president in 50 years. She was preceded by Dr. James C. Bailey from 1971 to 2003 and Dr. Ben Johnson from 1965 to 1971. The college is located in the southern portion of Cullman County. Athletic programs at Wallace State include men's and women's basketball, baseball, softball, men's and women's golf, men's and women's tennis, men's and women's cross country, volleyball and cheerleading. The college also has a robust intramural sports department offering volleyball, flag football, pickleball, basketball, wallyball, indoor soccer, ping pong, pool, disc golf, tennis, and cornhole.

== Government ==
Cullman County is overwhelmingly Republican at the presidential level. The last Democrat to win the county in a presidential election is Jimmy Carter, who won it by a slim majority in 1980 despite losing the state of Alabama to Ronald Reagan.

United States presidential election results for Cullman County, Alabama
Year	Republican		Democratic		Third party(ies)	
Year	No.	%	No.	%	No.	%
1880	163	32.67%	336	67.33%	0	0.00%
1884	232	31.35%	506	68.38%	2	0.27%
1888	350	27.52%	920	72.33%	2	0.16%
1892	6	0.29%	1,066	50.69%	1,031	49.03%
1896	447	24.61%	1,202	66.19%	167	9.20%
1900	820	38.26%	1,167	54.46%	156	7.28%
1904	1,238	41.02%	1,497	49.60%	283	9.38%
1908	1,521	52.39%	1,239	42.68%	143	4.93%
1912	264	9.12%	1,230	42.49%	1,401	48.39%
1916	1,351	48.90%	1,396	50.52%	16	0.58%
1920	3,492	57.24%	2,566	42.06%	43	0.70%
1924	1,639	45.11%	1,809	49.79%	185	5.09%
1928	2,959	65.28%	1,574	34.72%	0	0.00%
1932	956	24.24%	2,910	73.78%	78	1.98%
1936	1,703	30.97%	3,781	68.76%	15	0.27%
1940	3,057	35.19%	5,603	64.51%	26	0.30%
1944	2,202	35.83%	3,898	63.43%	45	0.73%
1948	1,755	32.72%	0	0.00%	3,609	67.28%
1952	3,391	39.13%	5,254	60.62%	22	0.25%
1956	4,381	44.12%	5,510	55.49%	38	0.38%
1960	4,248	40.08%	6,346	59.87%	5	0.05%
1964	7,152	58.33%	0	0.00%	5,110	41.67%
1968	4,964	28.75%	1,115	6.46%	11,186	64.79%
1972	14,390	79.54%	3,571	19.74%	130	0.72%
1976	6,899	34.40%	12,961	64.63%	195	0.97%
1980	10,212	45.92%	11,525	51.82%	503	2.26%
1984	14,782	63.92%	7,989	34.55%	355	1.54%
1988	14,351	61.87%	8,517	36.72%	329	1.42%
1992	14,411	49.62%	10,451	35.98%	4,181	14.40%
1996	14,308	53.88%	9,544	35.94%	2,701	10.17%
2000	19,157	64.88%	9,758	33.05%	610	2.07%
2004	26,818	76.21%	8,045	22.86%	328	0.93%
2008	28,896	81.85%	5,864	16.61%	545	1.54%
2012	28,999	83.92%	5,052	14.62%	504	1.46%
2016	32,989	87.10%	3,798	10.03%	1,086	2.87%
2020	36,880	88.12%	4,478	10.70%	493	1.18%
2024	38,704	89.70%	4,039	9.36%	403	0.93%

United States Senate election results for Cullman County, Alabama2
Year	Republican		Democratic		Third party(ies)	
Year	No.	%	No.	%	No.	%
2020	35,949	86.14%	5,693	13.64%	93	0.22%

United States Senate election results for Cullman County, Alabama3
Year	Republican		Democratic		Third party(ies)	
Year	No.	%	No.	%	No.	%
2022	23,228	88.92%	1,951	7.47%	944	3.61%

Alabama Gubernatorial election results for Cullman County
Year	Republican		Democratic		Third party(ies)	
Year	No.	%	No.	%	No.	%
2022	23,277	88.93%	1,662	6.35%	1,235	4.72%

== Communities ==
=== Cities ===
- Arab (mostly in Marshall County)
- Cullman (county seat)
- Good Hope
- Hanceville

=== Towns ===
- Baileyton
- Berlin
- Colony
- Dodge City
- Fairview
- Garden City (partly in Blount County)
- Holly Pond
- South Vinemont
- West Point

=== Census-designated places ===
- East Point
- Joppa (partly in Marshall County)

=== Unincorporated communities ===
- Arkadelphia
- Battleground
- Birdsong
- Black Bottom
- Bremen
- Brooklyn
- Bug Tussle
- Corinth
- Crane Hill
- Damascus
- Jones Chapel
- Logan
- Phelan
- Simcoe
- Spring Hill
- Trimble
- Vinemont
- Walter
- Welti
- Wilburn
- White City

== See also ==
- National Register of Historic Places listings in Cullman County, Alabama
- Properties on the Alabama Register of Landmarks and Heritage in Cullman County, Alabama
