= Alabama State Route 91 =

State highway in Alabama, United States

State Route 91

Route information
- Maintained by ALDOT
- Length: 38.161 mi (61.414 km)

Major junctions
- South end: SR 69 in Wilburn
- I-65 near Hanceville; US 31 in Hanceville
- North end: US 278 in Holly Pond

Location
- Country: United States
- State: Alabama

Highway system
- Alabama State Highway System; Interstate; US; State
| ← US 90 | → SR 92 |

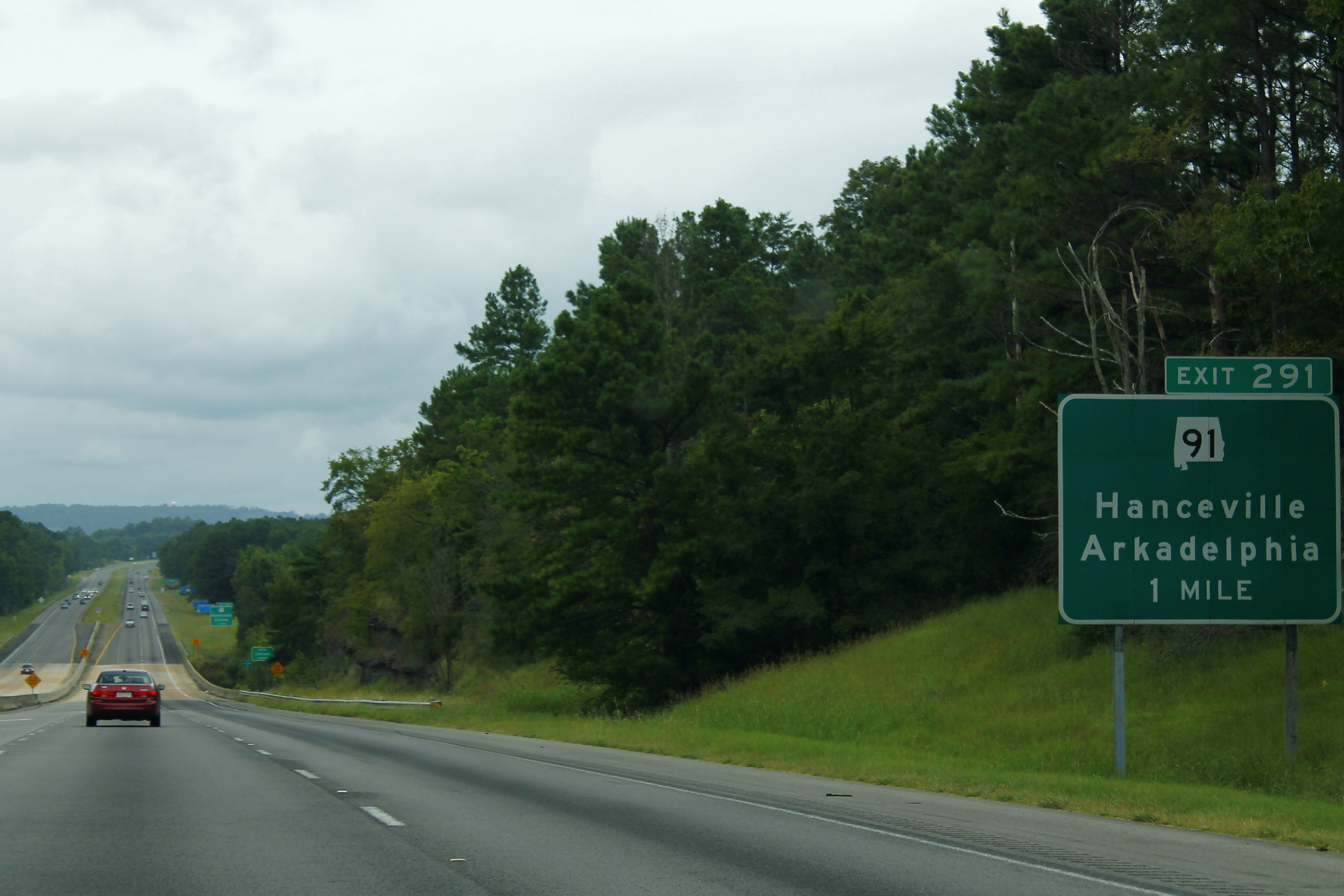
An exit sign for Exit 291 on Interstate 65 depicting AL 91.

State Route 91 (SR 91) is a 38.161-mile-long (61.414 km) state highway located entirely within Cullman County in the northern part of the U.S. state of Alabama. The southern terminus of the highway is at an intersection with SR 69 in Wilburn, a small unincorporated community in the southwestern part of the county that is also known as Bug Tussle. The northern terminus of the highway is at an intersection with U.S. Route 278 (US 278) in Holly Pond.

== Route description ==
SR 91 is a two-lane highway that travels through rural areas of Cullman County. Although it is signed as a north–south highway, the first 8 miles (13 km) of the highway from its southern terminus actually travels in southeasterly direction. In Arkadelphia, the highway takes a virtual 90-degree turn to the left and assumes a northeasterly trajectory, which it maintains for the duration of its length.

SR 91 has an interchange with Interstate 65 (I-65) approximately 11 miles (18 km) southwest of Hanceville, and provides a connecting route for motorists heading to and from this town. Our Lady of the Angels Monastery, founded by Mother Angelica, is located near SR 91 between I-65 and Hanceville.

Much of the highway between Wilburn and I-65 is a narrow winding road through hilly rural terrain. In some places, the road is actually substandard for it to be a numbered state route. However, from I-65 north and east, the roadway is substantially better and contains less sharp turns and short sightlines.

== Major intersections ==
The entire route is in Cullman County.

| Location | mi | km | Destinations | Notes |
|---|---|---|---|---|
| Wilburn | 0.000 | 0.000 | SR 69 | Southern terminus |
| Colony | 14.538 | 23.397 | I-65 – Huntsville, Birmingham | I-65 exit 291 |
| Hanceville | 25.179 | 40.522 | US 31 (SR 3) – Cullman, Garden City | |
| Holly Pond | 38.161 | 61.414 | US 278 (SR 74) | Northern terminus |
1.000 mi = 1.609 km; 1.000 km = 0.621 mi
