= Colony, Alabama =

- Town
- Location of Colony in Cullman County, Alabama.
- Coordinates: 33°56′42″N 86°53′28″W
- Country: United States
- State: Alabama
- County: Cullman

Government
  - Mayor: Jasmine Cole

Area
  - Total: 2.17 sq mi (5.63 km^{2})
  - Land: 2.16 sq mi (5.60 km^{2})
  - Water: 0.0077 sq mi (0.02 km^{2})
- Elevation: 446 ft (136 m)

Population (2020)
  - Total: 264
  - Density: 122.0/sq mi (47.11/km^{2})
- Time zone: UTC-6 (Central (CST))
  - Summer (DST): UTC-5 (CDT)
- FIPS code: 01-16684
- GNIS feature ID: 2406297

Colony is a town in Cullman County, Alabama, United States. As of the 2020 census, Colony had a population of 264. Colony is a historically African-American town. In its early days it was a haven for African Americans in the Deep South. It incorporated in 1981.

== Geography ==
Colony is located in southern Cullman County approximately 1 mile (1.6 km) north of the Mulberry Fork of the Black Warrior River. The town is located along Alabama State Route 91, approximately one mile west of Interstate 65.

According to the U.S. Census Bureau, the town has a total area of 2.3 square miles (5.9 km^{2}), of which 0.008 square miles (0.02 km^{2}), or 0.40%, is water.

== History ==
Colony most likely was originally established soon after the emancipation of enslaved people after the Civil War, during Reconstruction. It is believed that the original settlers of the town were most likely freed enslaved people from Baltimore, Alabama. It is the only African American community in Cullman County, which was founded in 1873, and was considered a safe haven for Black people at a time when other cities with white majorities were dangerous for Black people, and referred to as 'sundown' cities because after sundown Black people were in danger there. Those that originally settled there were given land as compensation for being slaves, with over 8,000 acres eventually cultivated as farm land.

In the early days of Colony it was not considered part of Cullman County because the freed Black people were not welcome. But when coal mines began to open adjacent to Colony the leaders of Cullman County wanted to incorporate the coal mines into the county for economic reasons, and were forced to add Colony as well. Colony was incorporated as a town in 1981 during the tenure of Mayor Earlene Johnson. The town celebrates Colony Day annually in August.

== Demographics ==
Historical population
Census	Pop.	Note	%±
1990	298		—
2000	385		29.2%
2010	268		−30.4%
2020	264		−1.5%
U.S. Decennial Census

=== 2020 census ===
Colony racial composition
Race	Num.	Perc.
White (non-Hispanic)	31	11.74%
Black or African American (non-Hispanic)	220	83.33%
Native American	1	0.38%
Asian	1	0.38%
Other/Mixed	8	3.03%
Hispanic or Latino	3	1.14%

As of the 2020 United States census, there were 264 people, 188 households, and 123 families residing in the town.

=== 2000 census ===
As of the census of 2000, there were 385 people, 130 households, and 99 families residing in the town. The population density was 171.6 inhabitants per square mile (66.3/km^{2}). There were 154 housing units at an average density of 68.6 per square mile (26.5/km^{2}). The racial makeup of the town was 5.71% White, 93.51% Black or African American, 0.26% Native American, 0.26% from other races, and 0.26% from two or more races. 0.78% of the population were Hispanic or Latino of any race.

There were 130 households, out of which 27.7% had children under the age of 18 living with them, 46.9% were married couples living together, 23.1% had a female householder with no husband present, and 23.8% were non-families. 20.8% of all households were made up of individuals, and 6.2% had someone living alone who was 65 years of age or older. The average household size was 2.92 and the average family size was 3.41.

In the town, the population was spread out, with 26.0% under the age of 18, 10.6% from 18 to 24, 27.3% from 25 to 44, 24.7% from 45 to 64, and 11.4% who were 65 years of age or older. The median age was 35 years. For every 100 females, there were 103.7 males. For every 100 females age 18 and over, there were 100.7 males.

The median income for a household in the town was $32,708, and the median income for a family was $35,417. Males had a median income of $24,821 versus $19,125 for females. The per capita income for the town was $12,415. About 12.0% of families and 12.7% of the population were below the poverty line, including 8.5% of those under age 18 and 41.3% of those age 65 or over.

== Notable person ==
- James C. Fields, member of the Alabama House of Representatives from 2008 to 2010
