= National Register of Historic Places listings in Clarke County, Alabama =

Location of Clarke County in Alabama

This is a list of the National Register of Historic Places listings in Clarke County, Alabama.

This is intended to be a complete list of the properties and districts on the National Register of Historic Places in Clarke County, Alabama, United States. Latitude and longitude coordinates are provided for many National Register properties and districts; these locations may be seen together in a Google map.

There are 21 properties and districts listed on the National Register in the county.

This National Park Service list is complete through NPS recent listings posted January 2, 2026.

== Current listings ==
| | Name on the Register | Image | Date listed | Location | City or town | Description |
|---|---|---|---|---|---|---|
| 1 | Airmount Grave Shelter | Airmount Grave Shelter | February 24, 2000 (#00000142) | Northern side of State Route 5, 0.5 miles west of the county line 31°58′08″N 87°40′09″W | Thomasville | |
| 2 | Alston-Cobb House | Alston-Cobb House | April 30, 1979 (#79000382) | 120 Cobb St. 31°42′33″N 87°47′34″W | Grove Hill | |
| 3 | Bush House | Bush House | July 28, 1999 (#99000885) | 168 N. Church St. 31°42′57″N 87°46′32″W | Grove Hill | |
| 4 | Clarke Mills | Clarke Mills | April 30, 1998 (#98000411) | 301 W. Church St. 31°30′33″N 87°53′50″W | Jackson | |
| 5 | Stephen Beech Cleveland House | Stephen Beech Cleveland House | July 28, 1999 (#99000886) | County Road 35, 2.4 miles south of U.S. Route 84; 31°36′36″N 87°41′16″W | Suggsville | |
| 6 | John A. Coate House | John A. Coate House | July 28, 1999 (#99000887) | DuBose St., between Church and Crawford Sts. 31°42′17″N 87°46′29″W | Grove Hill | |
| 7 | Cobb House | Cobb House | July 28, 1999 (#99000888) | U.S. Route 84, 1.4 miles west of U.S. Route 43; 31°42′28″N 87°48′07″W | Grove Hill | |
| 8 | Dickinson House | Dickinson House | September 13, 1978 (#78000485) | 101 Dickinson Ave. 31°42′36″N 87°46′21″W | Grove Hill | |
| 9 | Fort Sinquefield | Fort Sinquefield | December 31, 1974 (#74000403) | Southeast of Grove Hill; 31°39′28″N 87°43′39″W | Grove Hill | |
| 10 | Gainestown Methodist Church and Cemetery | Gainestown Methodist Church and Cemetery | July 28, 1999 (#99000889) | County Road 29, 0.3 miles south of County Road 33; 31°26′31″N 87°41′40″W | Gainestown | |
| 11 | Gainestown Schoolhouse | Gainestown Schoolhouse | October 1, 1992 (#92000033) | Western side of Gainestown-Suggsville Public Rd. north of Good Hope Church; 31°27′10″N 87°41′33″W | Gainestown | |
| 12 | Grove Hill Courthouse Square Historic District | Grove Hill Courthouse Square Historic District | April 30, 1998 (#98000410) | Roughly along Cobb, Court, Jackson, and Main Sts. 31°42′32″N 87°46′41″W | Grove Hill | |
| 13 | Jackson Historic District | Jackson Historic District | January 23, 1998 (#97001656) | Roughly along College, Forest, and Carroll Aves., bounded by Cedar, Florida, Commerce, Clinton, and Spruce Sts. 31°30′53″N 87°53′30″W | Jackson | |
| 14 | Doit W. McClellan Lustron House | Doit W. McClellan Lustron House | February 24, 2000 (#00000136) | 116 W. Pearl St. 31°30′59″N 87°53′45″W | Jackson | |
| 15 | J. P. McKee Lustron House | J. P. McKee Lustron House | February 24, 2000 (#00000132) | 519 College Ave. 31°31′00″N 87°53′43″W | Jackson | |
| 16 | Isaac Nettles Gravestones | Isaac Nettles Gravestones | February 24, 2000 (#00000141) | Eastern side of Mt. Nebo Rd., 0.5 miles south of County Road 19; 31°20′47″N 87°52′05″W | Carlton | |
| 17 | Jesse Pickens Pugh Farmstead | Jesse Pickens Pugh Farmstead | July 28, 1999 (#99000890) | U.S. Route 84, 3.5 miles west of Grove Hill; 31°42′21″N 87°49′58″W | Grove Hill | |
| 18 | Thomasville Historic District | Thomasville Historic District | February 12, 1999 (#99000151) | Roughly bounded by U.S. Route 43, 1145 W. Front St., Wilson St., and 818 W. 3rd St. 31°54′49″N 87°44′17″W | Thomasville | |
| 19 | Whatley Historic District | Whatley Historic District | April 30, 1998 (#98000409) | Roughly along Whatley Rd. from Grove Hill to the railroad tracks 31°39′01″N 87°42′24″W | Whatley | |
| 20 | Wilson-Finlay House | Wilson-Finlay House | July 12, 1978 (#78000484) | North of Gainestown on Suggsville Rd. 31°27′12″N 87°41′29″W | Gainestown | |
| 21 | Woodlands | Woodlands | April 28, 1980 (#80000683) | Off U.S. Route 84; 31°35′03″N 87°34′24″W | Gosport | |

== See also ==
- List of National Historic Landmarks in Alabama
- National Register of Historic Places listings in Alabama
