= Gosport, Alabama =

Unincorporated community in Alabama, United States

- Unincorporated community
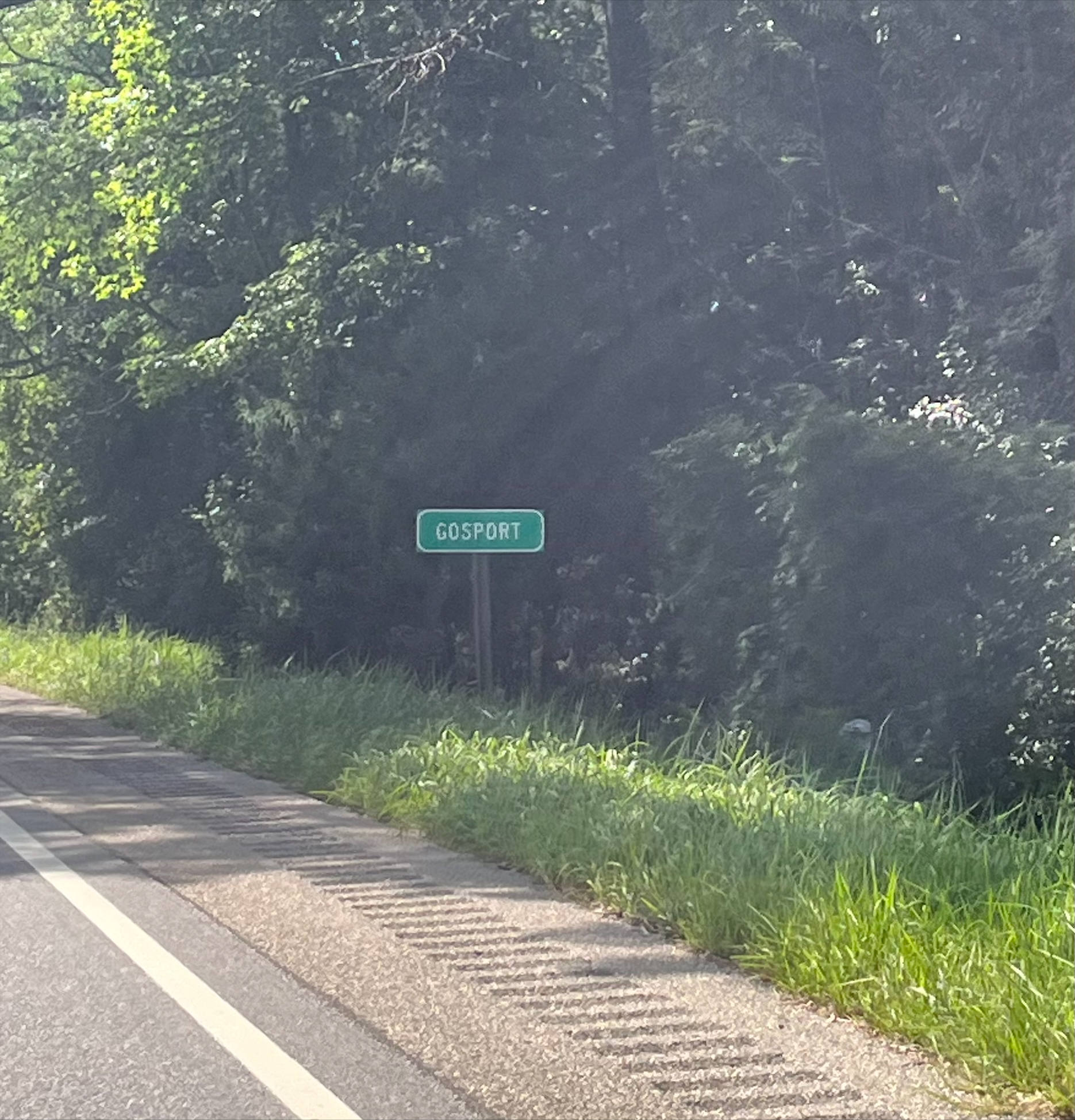
- Gosport Road Sign

- Location of Gosport in Alabama
- Coordinates: 31°34′57″N 87°35′09″W
- Country: United States
- State: Alabama
- County: Clarke
- Elevation: 112 ft (34 m)
- Time zone: UTC-6 (Central (CST))
  - Summer (DST): UTC-5 (CDT)
- ZIP code: 36482
- Area code: 251
- FIPS code: 01-01025
- GNIS feature ID: 119188

Gosport is an unincorporated community in Clarke County, Alabama, United States. Gosport is also close to the unincorporated town of Whatley, the two are usually confused with one another, and sometimes thought as the same place.

The telephone area code, is 251, while the ZIP code is 36482. Gosport is situated where the Claiborne Bridge crosses the Alabama River into Monroe County.

Woodlands, also known as the Frederick Blount Plantation, is a historic plantation house in Gosport. The house was added to the National Register of Historic Places on April 28, 1980, due to its architectural significance.

Gosport was recorded to have a population of 500 according to the 1850 U.S. Census, making it the largest community at that time in Clarke County, twice that of the second largest community of Choctaw Corner, which is today's Thomasville.

== Demographics ==
Historical population
Census	Pop.	Note	%±
1850	500		—
U.S. Decennial Census
