= Loula =

Female given name

The given name Loula may refer to:

- Loula Bint Siddaty Ould Abba (1958–2011), Mauritanian musician
- Loula Anagnostaki (1928–2017), Greek writer
- Loula Ali Ismail (born 1978), Djibouti-Canadian film director and screenwriter
- Loula Roberts Platt (1863–1934), American suffragist and first woman to run for a seat in the North Carolina Senate
- Loula Friend Dunn (1896-1977), American social worker, public welfare administrator, and first woman executive director of the American Public Welfare Association.
