= Clarke County Courthouse =

Clarke County Courthouse may refer to:

- Clarke County Courthouse (Alabama), part of the Grove Hill Courthouse Square Historic District, Grove Hill, Alabama
- Clarke County Courthouse (Georgia), Athens, Georgia
- Clarke County Courthouse (Iowa), Osceola, Iowa
- Old Clarke County Courthouse (Virginia), Berryville, Virginia

== See also ==
- Clark County Courthouse (disambiguation)
