= WBMH =

- Grove Hill, Alabama; United States
- Frequency: 106.1 MHz
- Branding: Bama 106

Programming
- Format: Classic country

Ownership
- Owner: Thomas Butts; (Pine City Radio, LLC)
- Sister stations: WHOD, WRJX

History
- First air date: 2000
- Former call signs: WFOW (1996–2002)

Technical information
- Licensing authority: FCC
- Facility ID: 8607
- Class: C3
- ERP: 12,000 watts
- HAAT: 144 meters (472 feet)
- Transmitter coordinates: 31°43′30″N 87°54′58″W

Links
- Public license information: Public file; LMS
- Webcast: Listen Live
- Website: pinecityradio.com

WBMH (106.1 FM) is a radio station licensed to serve the community of Grove Hill, Alabama, United States. The station is owned by Thomas Butts, through licensee Pine City Radio, LLC.

== Programming ==
Until mid-November 2017, WBMH broadcast a classic country music format and uses programming from Citadel Media and Jones Radio Network, as well as NASCAR programming from MRN Radio and the Performance Racing Network.

In addition to its usual music programming, WBMH and sister station WHOD broadcast the football and baseball games of Jackson High School, Leroy High School, Washington County High School, Jackson Academy and Clarke Preparatory School. WBMH is an affiliate station for University of South Alabama football broadcasts.

== History ==
The station was assigned the WBMH call letters by the Federal Communications Commission on March 4, 2002.

In mid-November 2017, WBMH went silent (off the air). (info taken from Alabama Broadcast Media Page)

In February 2018, WBMH returned to the air with classic country, branded as "Bama 106".
