= WHOD =

- Jackson, Alabama; United States
- Broadcast area: Thomasville, Alabama
- Frequency: 94.5 MHz
- Branding: Smash Hits 94.5

Programming
- Format: Variety hits

Ownership
- Owner: Thomas Butts; (Pine City Radio, LLC)
- Sister stations: WBMH, WRJX

History
- First air date: 1964
- Former call signs: WHOD-FM (1978–2002); WHNB (2002–2004)
- Call sign meaning: Heart Of Dixie

Technical information
- Licensing authority: FCC
- Facility ID: 8605
- Class: C2
- ERP: 30,000 watts
- HAAT: 195 meters (640 feet)
- Transmitter coordinates: 31°28′59″N 87°47′27″W

Links
- Public license information: Public file; LMS
- Webcast: Listen Live
- Website: pinecityradio.com

WHOD (94.5 FM) is a radio station licensed to serve Jackson, Alabama, United States. The station is owned by Thomas Butts, through licensee Pine City Radio, LLC.

Until mid-November 2017, WHOD aired a variety hits music format featuring programming from ABC Radio and Jones Radio Network. In addition to its usual music programming, WHOD and sister station WBMH aired the football and baseball games of Jackson High School, Leroy High School, Washington County High School, Jackson Academy, and Clarke Preparatory School. WHOD was also an affiliate of the Crimson Tide Sports Network.

== History ==
WHOD signed on in 1948 as WHOD, licensed then to Homestead, PA. WHOD became WAMO in 1956.

In November 1982, control of Vogel-Ellington Corporation, the station's licensee at the time, was transferred from William R. Vogel to William R. Vogel Jr. The transfer was approved by the FCC on December 17, 1982, and the transaction was consummated on March 2, 1983. In May 1988, Vogel-Ellington Corporation reached an agreement to sell this station to Radio Station WHOD Inc. The deal was approved by the FCC on June 14, 1988, and the transaction was consummated on July 1, 1988.

In February 1994, Radio Station WHOD Inc. reached an agreement to sell this station. The deal was approved by the FCC on March 7, 1994, and the transaction was consummated on April 25, 1994.

The station was assigned the WHOD call letters by the Federal Communications Commission on December 31, 2004.

In July 2017, WHOD changed their format to variety hits, branded as "Smash Hits 94.5".

In mid-November 2017, WHOD went silent (off the air).

In February 2018, WHOD returned to the air with variety hits, branded as "Smash Hits 94.5".
