= Fort White =

Fort White may refer to:

- Fort White, Burma, a small military station built by the British Army
- Fort White, Eastern Cape, established in 1835 as a base for the British army
- Fort White, Florida
- Fort White, settler fort built in Alabama during the Creek War
