= American Public Human Services Association =

Nonprofit organization in Washington D.C., United States

The American Public Human Services Association (APHSA) is a nonprofit organization and bipartisan membership association that supports leaders from human services agencies. Founded in 1930 as the American Association of Public Welfare Officials, the APHSA is headquartered in Washington, D.C. The APHSA's mission is to "advance the well-being of all people by influencing modern approaches to sound policy, building the capacity of public agencies to enable healthy families and communities, and connecting leaders to accelerate learning and generate practical solutions together."

== History ==
The American Association of Public Welfare Officials was founded in 1930 as a result of the 1929 annual meeting of the National Conference of Social Work. It initially had a narrow scope, to gather data on the need for public welfare in order to advise the Emergency Committee for Employment. In 1932, grant from the Rockefeller Foundation allowed the AAPWO to hire staff and open an office in Washington, D.C.

Over time, the purview of the organization broadened to include consulting for a wider variety of stakeholders, including national committees, volunteer agencies, and state officials. In May 1932, the organization changed its name to the American Public Welfare Association and moved its headquarters to Chicago. During this period, the APWA advocated for the Social Security Act of 1935 and continued to advise state and national leaders on structuring and administering public welfare programs. Eleanor Roosevelt spoke at the 1935 APWA national roundtable and became a long-term collaborator with the organization. During World War II, the APWA coordinated relief efforts for refugee children and the unemployed. From 1948 to 1964, Loula Friend Dunn served as the first woman executive director of the APWA. During this period, the APWA was involved in several amendments to the Social Security Act.

The APWA faced challenges during the War on Poverty due to heavy case loads, understaffing, and the difficulty of lobbying federal policymakers while the organization was headquartered in Chicago. The headquarters moved back to Washington, D.C. in 1974. The APWA was influential in the formation of the Supplemental Security Income program by liaising between the Social Security Administration and state agencies.

Steven A. Minton became the first black president of the organization in 1977. In 1998, the organization changed its name again, becoming the American Public Human Services Association. In 2001 and 2002, the APHSA published Crossroads: New Directions in Social Policy, a set of policy recommendations which were largely adopted by Congress in 2003.

== Archives ==
The University of Minnesota library holds the records of the American Public Welfare Association from 1930 to 1970. The collection includes bylaws, correspondence, annual reports, project proposals, and publications created or collected by the APWA.

== Issues ==
The APHSA takes on many issues, including:

- Adoption
- Child Care
- Child Support
- Child Welfare
- Disabilities
- Food Stamps
- Temporary Assistance for Needy Families

== Affiliates ==
- American Association of Food Stamp Directors
- American Association of Welfare Attorneys
- Association of Administrators of the Interstate Compact on Adoption and Medical Assistance
- Association of Administrators of the Interstate Compact on the Placement of Children
- IT Solutions Management for Human Services
- National Association for Program Information and Performance Measurement
- National Association of Public Child Welfare Administrators
- National Association of State Child Care Administrators
- National Association of State Medicaid Directors
- Center for Workers with Disabilities
- National Association of State TANF Administrators
- National Staff Development and Training Association
