= Zachariah Bettis =

American politician

- Born: Zachariah Lawrence Bettis; June 12, 1816
- Died: September 23, 1879 (aged 63)
- Occupation: Judge
- Years active: 1850s-1870s

Zachariah Bettis

Probate Judge of Clarke County, Alabama
- In office 1856–1866

Zechariah Lawrence Bettis (June 12, 1816 – September 23, 1879) was an American politician who served as the Probate Judge of Clarke County, Alabama during the American Civil War. He was born in Edgefield, South Carolina and was a part of a migration from Edgefield County to Clarke County. In 1856, he was elected the Probate Judge of Clarke County. Under the constitution of the time, the Probate Judge was the chief executive official of an Alabama county. He remained in this office until 1866. He died in Grove Hill, Alabama in 1879.

He was 1st cousins, once separated with John Cranford who served as President Pro Tempore of the Texas Senate, later serving a term in Congress. His wife, Elizabeth Talbert, was second cousins with South Carolina Congressman W. Jasper Talbert, who represented Edgefield in Congress, and he was third cousins, once separated with Reps. Henry Swearingen of Ohio and Thomas Van Swearingen of Virginia. Bettis's son Alfred became a physician and later moved to Texas.
