= Clark County Courthouse =

Clark County Courthouse may refer to:

- Clark County Courthouse (Arkansas), Arkadelphia, Arkansas
- Clark County Courthouse (Kansas), Ashland, Kansas
- Clark County Court House (Kentucky), Winchester, Kentucky
- Clark County Courthouse (Missouri), Kahoka, Missouri
- Clark County Courthouse (Ohio), Springfield, Ohio
- Clark County Courthouse (South Dakota), Clark, South Dakota
- Clark County Courthouse (Washington), Vancouver, Washington, listed on the National Register of Historic Places

== See also ==
- Clarke County Courthouse (disambiguation)
