= Newman O'Neal =

American politician, mayor of Hobson City, Alabama

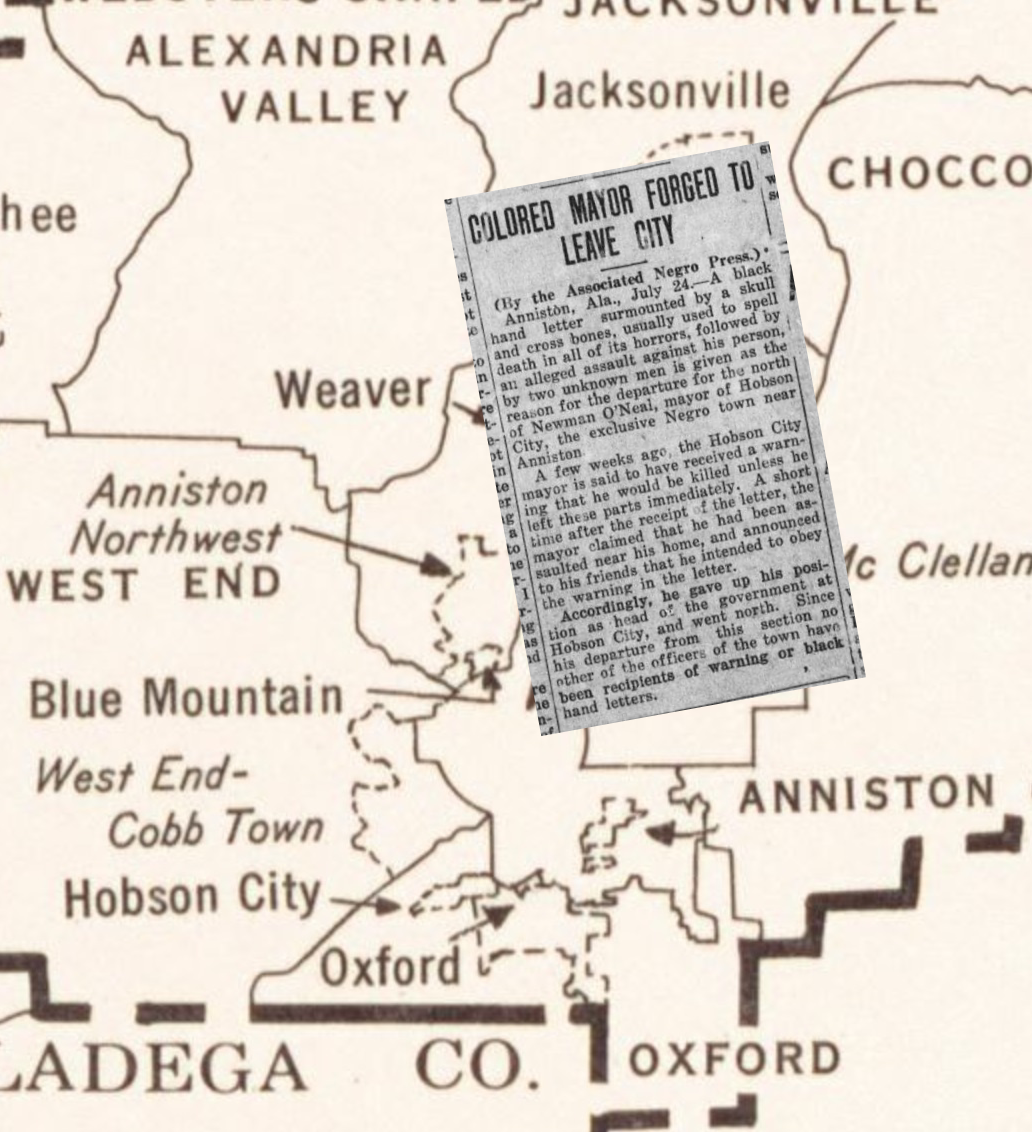
- News Article of the incident on a map of Hobson City

Mayor of Hobson City, Alabama
- In office ? – July 1919

Newman O'Neal was the mayor of Hobson City, Alabama, until he faced death threats and was assaulted forcing him to flee.

== Hobson City ==
To prevent a large population of Black voters from swaying the election of Oxford, Alabama, Mayor Whitehead of Oxford went to the state capitol and had the corporate boundaries of Oxford redrawn to exclude what is now Hobson City. The town was incorporated on August 16, 1899. Records from a contemporary Alabama newspaper, The Peoples' Journal, described the municipality as "the only municipality controlled and governed entirely by colored people anywhere in the United States." The newspaper further commented: "The whole country will doubtless be interested in the result of this experiment." Under the leadership of the first mayor, S. L. Davis, and the first police chief, James Duran, police protection was restored to the area. The town was named after Richmond P. Hobson, a white naval hero in the then-recent Spanish-American War and member of Congress.

== Death threats ==
In the summer of 1919, the mayor of Hobson City, Alabama, was Newman O'Neal. He served his community until he received death threats in the form of a "black hand letter surmounted by a skull and crossbones." He ignored the letter but he was assaulted by unknown aggressors and seriously injured forcing him north into exile in late July 1919. The acting Mayor J. D. Kirksey also received an unsigned death threat letter. Author Cameron McWhirter says this was a typical tactic of the Ku Klux Klan.

== Aftermath ==
This uprising was one of several incidents of civil unrest that began in the so-called American Red Summer, of 1919. The Summer consisted of terrorist attacks on black communities, and white oppression in over three dozen cities and counties. In most cases, white mobs attacked African American neighborhoods. In some cases, black community groups resisted the attacks, especially in Chicago and Washington, D.C. Most deaths occurred in rural areas during events like the Elaine massacre in Arkansas, where an estimated 100 to 240 black people and 5 white people were killed. Also occurring in 1919 were the Chicago Race Riot and Washington D.C. race riot which killed 38 and 39 people respectively, and with both having many more non-fatal injuries and extensive property damage reaching up into the millions of dollars.

== See also ==
- Washington race riot of 1919
- Mass racial violence in the United States
- List of incidents of civil unrest in the United States

== Bibliography ==
Notes

References

- The Dallas Express (July 26, 1919). "Colored Major Forced to Leave The City". The Dallas Express. Dallas, Texas: W.E. King. ISSN 2331-334X. OCLC 9839625.
- Edmonds, Helen G. (1971). Black faces in high places: Negroes in government. Harcourt Brace Jovanovich. ISBN 9780153710735. - Total pages: 277
- The Kansas City Sun (July 26, 1919). "By the Associated Negro Press". The Kansas City Sun. Kansas City, Missouri: N.C. Crews. pp. 1–8. ISSN 2166-8329. OCLC 21244408.
- McWhirter, Cameron (2011). Red Summer: The Summer of 1919 and the Awakening of Black America. Henry Holt and Company. ISBN 9781429972932. - Total pages: 368
- The New York Times (October 5, 1919). "For Action on Race Riot Peril; Radical Propaganda Among Negroes Growing, and Increase of Mob Violence Set Out in Senate Brief for Federal Inquiry". The New York Times. New York, NY. p. 112. ISSN 1553-8095. OCLC 1645522.
- Associated Negro Press (July 26, 1919). "Black Hand Letter Drives Mayor From City". Phoenix Tribune. Phoenix, Arizona: Tribune Pub. Co. p. 4. OCLC 35642959.
