= Hobson City, Alabama =

- Town
- Seal

- Location of Hobson City in Calhoun County, Alabama.
- Coordinates: 33°37′08″N 85°51′36″W
- Country: United States
- State: Alabama
- County: Calhoun

Government
  - Mayor: Alberta McCrory

Area
  - Total: 1.05 sq mi (2.71 km^{2})
  - Land: 1.05 sq mi (2.71 km^{2})
  - Water: 0 sq mi (0.00 km^{2})
- Elevation: 866 ft (264 m)

Population (2020)
  - Total: 759
  - Density: 725.8/sq mi (280.25/km^{2})
- Time zone: UTC-6 (Central (CST))
  - Summer (DST): UTC-5 (CDT)
- ZIP: 36201
- FIPS code: 01-35152
- GNIS feature ID: 2405845
- Website: http://www.townofhobsoncity.com/

Hobson City is a town in Calhoun County, Alabama, United States. At the 2020 census, the population was 759. It is included in the Anniston-Oxford Metropolitan Statistical Area. Hobson City became Alabama's first self-governed all-black municipality in 1899 and continues to have an African American majority.

== History ==
The town of Hobson City, originally known as Mooree Quarters, is a historic Black community near Oxford, Alabama. Established shortly after the Civil War, the settlement was named after Silas Moore, a formerly enslaved man who became a prominent landowner and community leader. By 1868, he and other Black residents had acquired land in the area, building homes, churches, and schools despite systemic racism and economic hardship.

Despite paying taxes, Black residents in and around Oxford were denied equal services—particularly education. Those in Mooree Quarters contributed $1,200 annually in school taxes to Oxford yet were barred from sending their children to white schools, while no adequate Black schools were provided.

In the late 1870s, Oxford's white leaders, including Mayor John J. Dungan and Calhoun County officials, began a campaign to forcibly relocate Black citizens out of Oxford proper into segregated areas like Mooree Quarters. This was part of a broader redlining effort to restrict Black land ownership and political influence.

A pivotal moment came in 1888 when Thomas Harris, Silas Moore's half-brother, ran for Justice of the Peace in Calhoun County to combat land theft. His candidacy and a speech he delivered at Mount Zion Baptist Church enraged white supremacists, accelerating efforts to expel Black residents from Oxford. By 1890, many Black families had been forcibly confined to Mooree Quarters—later renamed Hobson City.

Under the 1899 Alabama Constitution, voting eligibility was restricted by stringent requirements, including being a male over 21, owning at least 40 acres of land, paying taxes, holding a steady job for 12 months, and being able to read and understand the Constitution. Despite these barriers, some Black property owners met the criteria and were permitted to vote in local elections. Twenty such men, who qualified under these terms, played a key role in the incorporation of the town.

For nearly three years, Mooree Quarters existed as an unincorporated settlement within the county. Determined to take control of their future, a committee of residents sought the advice of attorney Ross Black in Anniston, Alabama. At the time, Black attorneys were barred from practicing law in the state. Ross Black recommended that the community incorporate their territory into an independent municipality. On July 20, 1899, approximately 125 Black residents of Mooree Quarters submitted a petition to Calhoun County Probate Judge E. F. Cook, requesting to establish their own distinct town. After completing the necessary legal steps, the town was officially incorporated on August 16, 1899, becoming the first city in Alabama founded solely by and for Black citizens. S. L. Davis was elected as Hobson City's first mayor. The town was named in honor of Richard P. Hobson, a white naval hero of the Spanish-American War and a member of the Alabama Legislature.

The town was incorporated on August 16, 1899. Records from a contemporary Alabama newspaper, The Peoples' Journal, described the municipality as "the only municipality controlled and governed entirely by colored people anywhere in the United States." The newspaper further commented, "The whole country will doubtless be interested in the result of this experiment." Under the leadership of the first mayor, S. L. Davis, and the first police chief, James Duran, police protection was restored to the area. The town was named after Richmond P. Hobson, a white naval hero in the then-recent Spanish-American War and member of Congress. Newman O'Neal was the mayor in 1919 until he faced death threats and was assaulted by the Ku Klux Klan forcing him to flee the city.

The mayor in 1970, J. R. Striplin, was its thirteenth black mayor in succession. The town has buildings listed on the National Register of Historic Places.

== Geography ==
Hobson City is located in southern Calhoun County. It is bordered by the city of Oxford to the south and the city of Anniston to the north. According to the U.S. Census Bureau, the town has a total area of 1.0 square mile (2.7 km^{2}), all land.

== Demographics ==
Historical population
Census	Pop.	Note	%±
1900	292		—
1910	344		17.8%
1920	371		7.8%
1930	404		8.9%
1940	508		25.7%
1950	672		32.3%
1960	770		14.6%
1970	1,124		46.0%
1980	1,268		12.8%
1990	794		−37.4%
2000	878		10.6%
2010	771		−12.2%
2020	759		−1.6%
U.S. Decennial Census; 2013 Estimate

=== 2020 census ===
Hobson City town, Alabama – Racial and ethnic composition Note: the US Census treats Hispanic/Latino as an ethnic category. This table excludes Latinos from the racial categories and assigns them to a separate category. Hispanics/Latinos may be of any race.
Race / Ethnicity (NH = Non-Hispanic)	Pop 2010	Pop 2020	% 2010	% 2020
White alone (NH)	96	96	12.45%	12.65%
Black or African American alone (NH)	658	612	85.34%	80.63%
Native American or Alaska Native alone (NH)	0	3	0.00%	0.40%
Asian alone (NH)	3	2	0.39%	0.26%
Native Hawaiian or Pacific Islander alone (NH)	0	0	0.00%	0.00%
Other race alone (NH)	0	0	0.00%	0.00%
Mixed race or Multiracial (NH)	4	34	0.52%	4.48%
Hispanic or Latino (any race)	10	12	1.30%	1.58%
Total	771	759	100.00%	100.00%

=== 2000 census ===
As of the census of 2000, there were 878 people, 363 households, and 242 families residing in the town. The population density was 802.8 inhabitants per square mile (310.0/km^{2}). There were 415 housing units at an average density of 379.5 per square mile (146.5/km^{2}). The racial makeup of the town was 92.71% Black, 6.15% White, 0.23% from other races, and 0.91% from two or more races. 0.57% of the population were Hispanic or Latino of any race.

There were 363 households, out of which 30.0% had children under the age of 18 living with them, 26.2% were married couples living together, 35.3% had a female householder with no husband present, and 33.1% were non-families. 29.8% of all households were made up of individuals, and 10.5% had someone living alone who was 65 years of age or older. The average household size was 2.42 and the average family size was 2.99.

In the town, the age distribution of the population shows 28.6% under the age of 18, 8.2% from 18 to 24, 29.0% from 25 to 44, 23.0% from 45 to 64, and 11.2% who were 65 years of age or older. The median age was 35 years. For every 100 females, there were 76.0 males. For every 100 females age 18 and over, there were 71.3 males.

The median income for a household in the town was $17,589, and the median income for a family was $20,368. Males had a median income of $21,667 versus $19,583 for females. The per capita income for the town was $8,992. About 30.7% of families and 30.2% of the population were below the poverty line, including 42.7% of those under age 18 and 15.5% of those age 65 or over.

== Sources ==
- Edmonds, Helen G. (1971). Black faces in high places: Negroes in government. Harcourt Brace Jovanovich. ISBN 9780153710735. - Total pages: 277
