= The Negro and Fusion Politics in North Carolina, 1894–1901 =

- Author: Helen G. Edmonds
- Language: English
- Subject: North Carolina History, African-American history, Fusionism in North Carolina
- Published: 1951 (University of North Carolina Press)
- Publication place: United States
- Media type: Print (hardback, paperback)
- Pages: 260
- OCLC: 423580

The Negro and Fusion Politics in North Carolina, 1894–1901 is a 1951 book by African American scholar Helen G. Edmonds.

== Publication history ==
- 1951, The Negro and Fusion Politics in North Carolina, 1894–1901 (University of North Carolina Press), oclc 423580.
- 1973, The Negro and Fusion Politics in North Carolina, 1894–1901 (Russell & Russell), ISBN 0846216922, oclc 627913.
- 2011, The Negro and Fusion Politics in North Carolina, 1894–1901 (University of North Carolina Press), ISBN 9780807855492, oclc 773281658.

== Reception ==
The Negro and Fusion Politics in North Carolina, 1894–1901 was called a seminal work by historians Jeffrey Crow and Robert Durden. A review in The Journal of Negro History wrote "Miss Edmonds has pointed the way in her penetrating study of the brief survival of effective participation by Negroes in the politics of one of the less backward and underdeveloped Southern states at the end of the last century."

It also generated criticism.

The Negro and Fusion Politics has also been reviewed by The Journal of Politics, and The North Carolina Historical Review.
