= Whatley Historic District =

- U.S. National Register of Historic Places
- U.S. Historic district
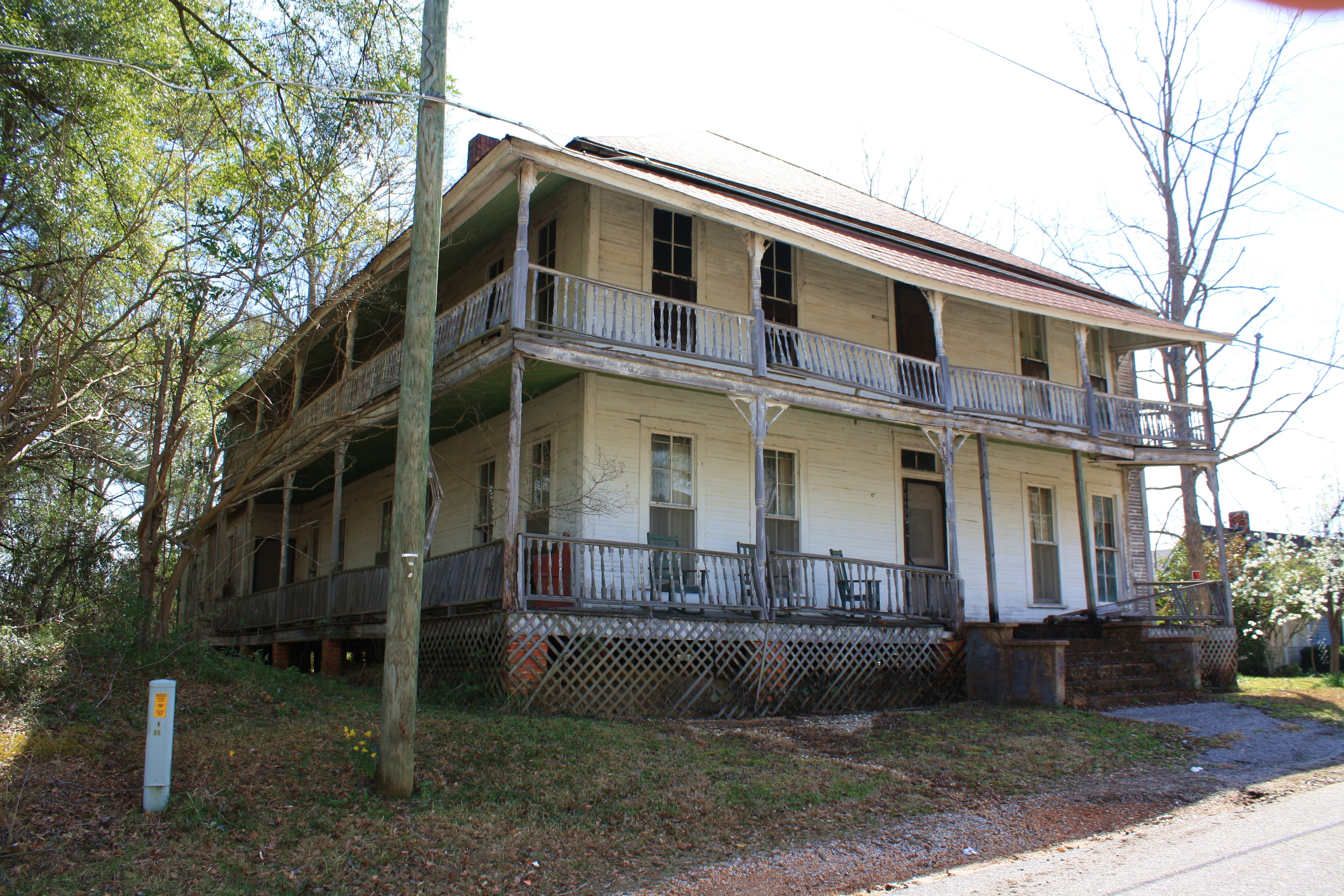
- The old Whatley Hotel in 2011

- Location within Alabama Location within the United States
- Location: Roughly along Whatley Rd., from Grove Hill to the RR tracks, Whatley, Alabama
- Coordinates: 31°38′58″N 87°42′18″W
- Area: 45 acres (18 ha)
- Architectural style: Bungalow/Craftsman, Queen Anne
- NRHP reference No.: 98000409
- Added to NRHP: April 30, 1998

The Whatley Historic District is a historic district in the community of Whatley, Alabama, United States. Whatley was founded with the establishment of a railroad depot in 1887, along the then-newly constructed railroad between Mobile and Selma. It was incorporated as a town in 1901. The historic district features examples of Craftsman, Queen Anne, and regional vernacular architecture. Spread over 45 acres (18 ha) with 17 contributing buildings and one object, it is roughly bounded by the Whatley Road from Grove Hill to the railroad tracks. It is a part of the Clarke County Multiple Property Submission and was placed on the National Register of Historic Places on April 30, 1998.
