= WRJX =

DWRJX
Jackson, Alabama; United States
- Frequency: 1230 kHz

Programming
- Format: Defunct

Ownership
- Owner: Thomas Butts; (Pine City Radio, LLC)
- Sister stations: WBMH, WHOD

History
- First air date: 1950
- Former call signs: WPBB (1950–1958); WTHG (1958–1964); WHOD (1964–2002)
- Call sign meaning: Radio Jackson

Technical information
- Facility ID: 8604
- Class: C
- Power: 1,000 watts (unlimited)
- Transmitter coordinates: 31°32′38″N 87°52′30″W

WRJX (1230 AM) was a radio station licensed to serve Jackson, Alabama. The station was owned by Thomas Butts, through licensee Pine City Radio, LLC. It previously aired an adult standards music format.

The station has been assigned the WRJX call letters by the Federal Communications Commission (FCC) since March 4, 2002.

Bennie Hewitt's Capital Assets sold this station, along with WHOD and WBMH, for $500,000 to Jason Kyzer's Kyzer Communications, in March 2017; the sale was consummated on June 8, 2017.

On November 14, 2017, WRJX went silent.

WRJX and sister stations WBMH and WHOD were purchased out of bankruptcy for $200,000 by Thomas Butts' Pine City Radio effective June 22, 2018.

On June 6, 2019, WRJX's license was cancelled by the FCC and the WRJX call sign deleted, due to the station having been silent for more than a year.
