= Jesse Pickens Pugh Farmstead =

Historic house in Alabama, United States

- U.S. National Register of Historic Places
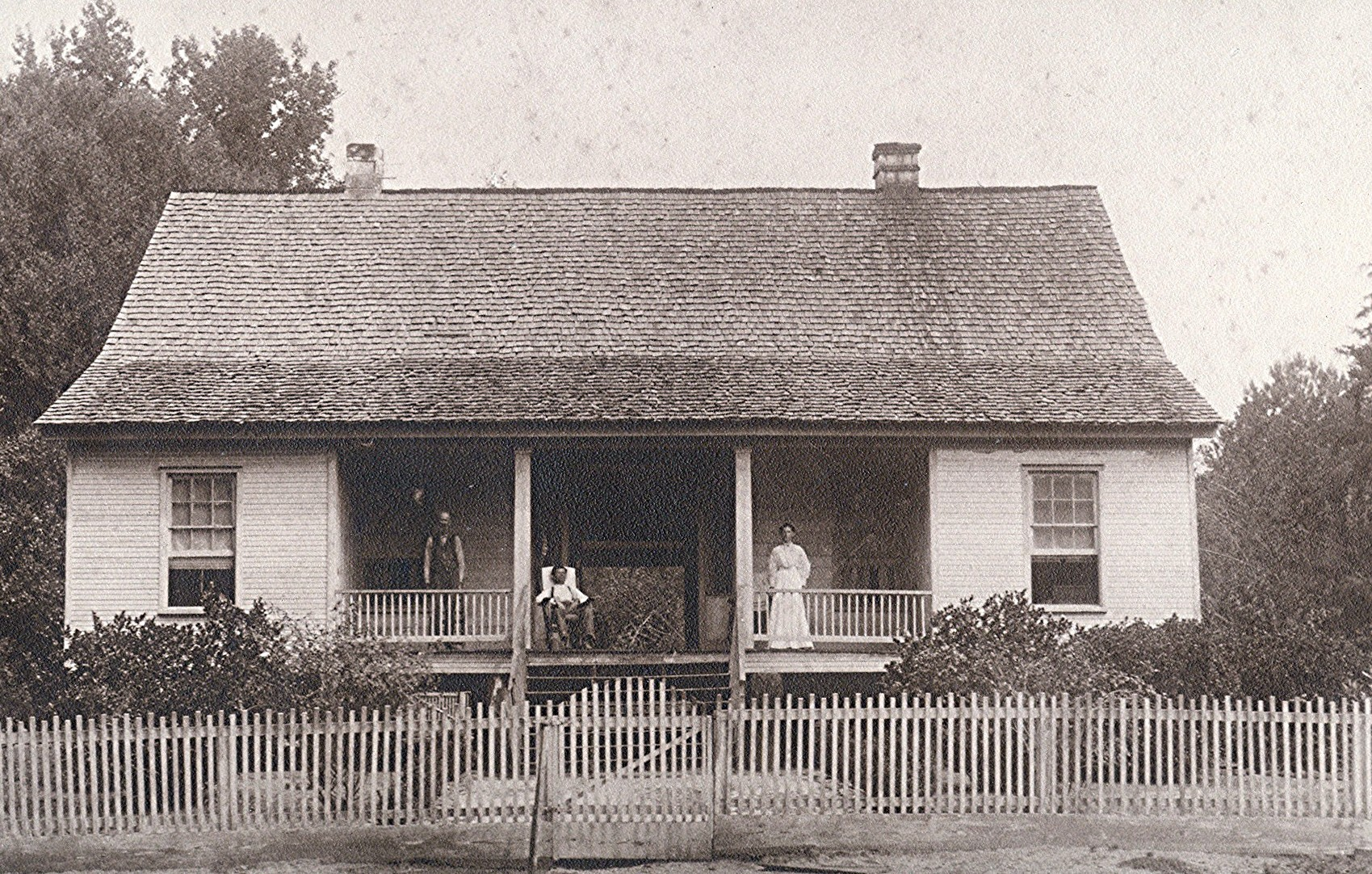
- Jesse Pickens Pugh Farmhouse circa 1900

- Location within Alabama Location within the United States
- Nearest city: Grove Hill, Alabama
- Coordinates: 31.70048°N 87.82988°W
- Area: 289 acres (117 ha)
- Built: 1865
- Architectural style: Half-spraddle roof cottage
- MPS: Clarke County MPS
- NRHP reference No.: 99000890
- Added to NRHP: July 28, 1999

The Jesse Pickens Pugh Farmstead is a historic 289-acre (117 ha) homestead near Grove Hill in rural Clarke County, Alabama, United States. The homestead contains seven contributing buildings, two contributing sites, and one contributing structure. These include a half-spraddle roof cottage that was built in 1865, agricultural outbuildings, agricultural fields, and burials. The complex was listed on the National Register of Historic Places on July 28, 1999, due to its architectural significance.

== Background ==
Jesse Pickens Pugh was born on April 17, 1829, in Clarke County, Alabama. He was the son of Isaac Pugh, born in 1785 in Georgia, and Hanna Baskin, born in 1793 in South Carolina. Isaac and Hanna Pugh settled in what was to become Clarke County in 1810, prior to the establishment of the county within the Mississippi Territory and the ensuing Creek War. His paternal grandfather, Elijah Pugh of North Carolina and Georgia, followed in 1811 and settled on adjoining land. Elijah Pugh was a Revolutionary War veteran.

Jesse Pickens Pugh married Sophia Bettis, who was born in 1839, on January 8, 1858, in Clarke County. Together they established their residence and had ten children, with nine living into adulthood. Jesse Pickens Pugh died on March 12, 1929, and is buried in the Pugh family cemetery.
