= Clarke County High School (Alabama) =

High school in Alabama, United States

Coordinates: 31°42′22″N 87°46′27″W

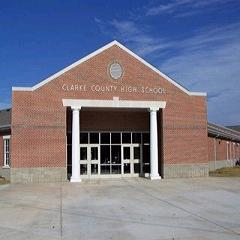
- Grove Hill, Clarke County, Alabama; United States

Information
- School type: Public high school
- School district: Clarke County Schools
- Principal: Christopher Young
- Gender: Mixed
- Colors: Royal blue and white
- Mascot: Bulldogs
- Website: cchs.clarkecountyschools.org

Clarke County High School is a public high school in Grove Hill, Alabama. Its mascot is the Bulldogs and the school colors are royal blue and white. The school runs on a four-block schedule. Christopher Young became the school's principal in 2020. Athletics include boys and girls basketball, baseball, softball, volleyball, football, and cheer. The school currently competes at the 2A level in Region 1.

The Bulldogs won state championships in Football (2021), Boys' Basketball (1989), Girls' Basketball (1991), Girls' Outdoor Track, (1979, 1980, 1984, 1986, 1987, 1988, 1989, 1990, and 1991) and Girls' Indoor Track (1983, 1988, and 1991.)
