= Gainestown, Alabama =

Unincorporated community in Alabama, United States

- Unincorporated community
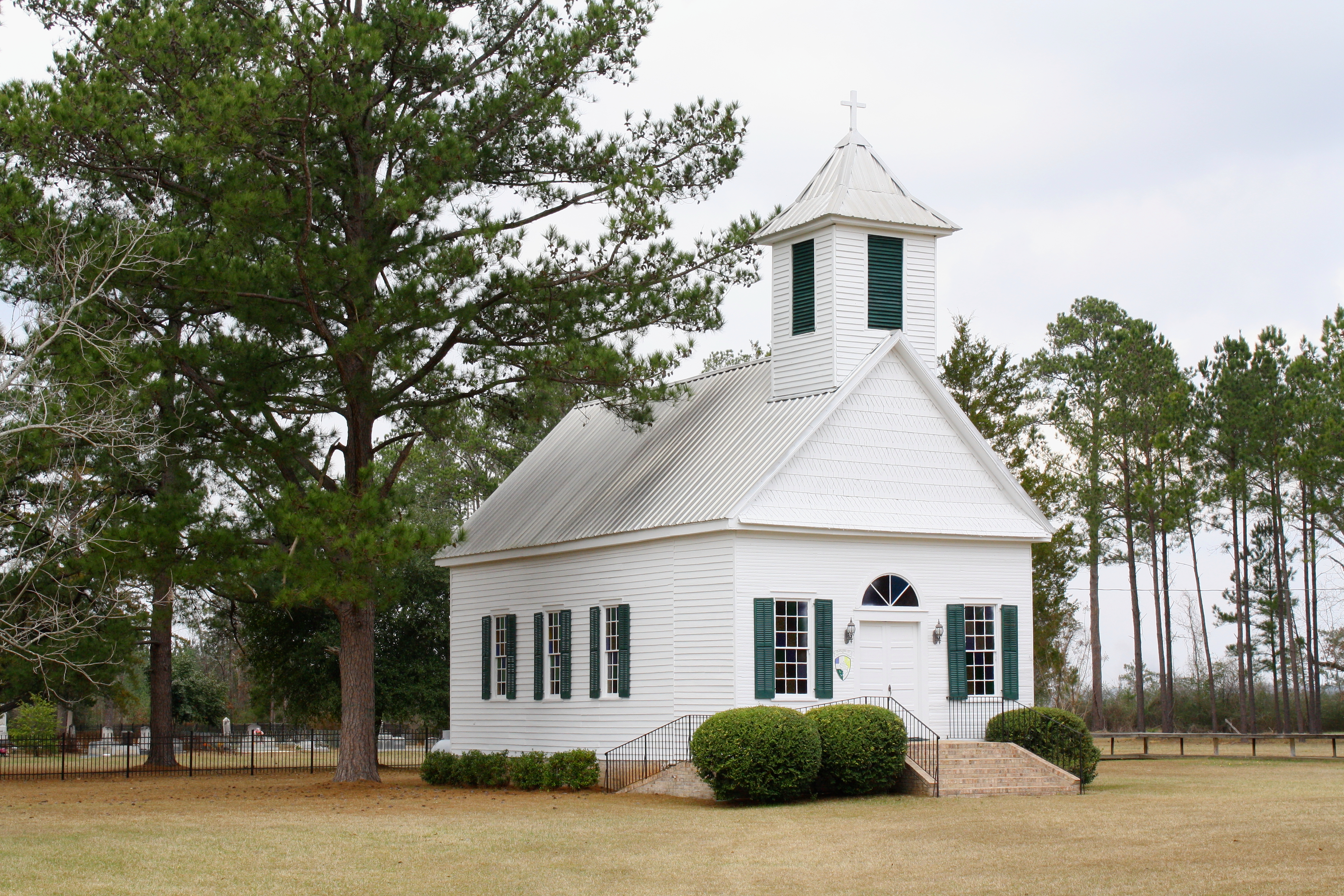
- Gainestown Methodist Church

- Location within the state of Alabama Gainestown, Alabama (the United States)
- Coordinates: 31.44544°N 87.69332°W
- Country: United States
- State: Alabama
- County: Clarke
- Established: c. 1815
- Time zone: UTC-6 (Central (CST))
  - Summer (DST): UTC-5 (CDT)
- ZIP code: 36540
- Area code: 251

Gainestown is an unincorporated community on the Alabama River in Clarke County, Alabama, United States. It was named for George Strother Gaines, who was the senior United States Indian agent in the region; he established a trading post here in 1809 for business with the Choctaw, the predominant tribe.

The exact date for the founding of the town is unclear. However, the community was being referred to as Gainestown by 1815, following the end of the Creek War and closure of the trading post in 1814. Gainestown grew to be a large town during the heyday of river-based transport, but a slow decline began after the American Civil War.

A tornado on March 26, 1911, destroyed at least 12 homes and much of the town. A contemporaneous account of the storm said that a dry goods store in the town was destroyed, with fragments of its products found as far away as 30 miles (48 km) to the east, in Monroe County.

Gainestown has three sites listed on the National Register of Historic Places: the Gainestown Methodist Church and Cemetery, Gainestown Schoolhouse, and the Wilson-Finlay House.

== Geography ==
Gainestown is located at 31.44544°N 87.69332°W and has an elevation of 266 feet (81 m).
