= Loula Friend Dunn =

American social welfare worker

- Loula Friend Dunn
- Born: May 1, 1896; Grove Hill, Alabama
- Died: June 28, 1977 (aged 81)
- Occupations: Social worker and policy advisor

Loula Friend Dunn (May 1, 1896 – June 28, 1977) was an American social worker and public welfare administrator who served as the first woman executive director of the American Public Welfare Association, which later became the American Public Human Services Association. Dunn was an influential policy advisor who worked closely with Eleanor Roosevelt, Lyndon B. Johnson, and Nelson Rockefeller.

== Early life and education ==
Loula Friend Dunn was born in Grove Hill, Alabama on May 1, 1896. She became a public school teacher before studying social work at Alabama Polytechnic Institute (later Auburn University) and the University of North Carolina Chapel Hill in the 1920s.

== Career ==
Dunn began her career as a social worker with the Alabama Child Welfare Department, where she started as a case worker and was eventually promoted to assistant director. In 1933, she became the director of the Alabama Relief Administration, which provided social services during the Great Depression.

Dunn was also an administrator of the Federal Emergency Relief Administration (FERA), which later became the Works Progress Administration (WPA). During her WPA service, she was responsible for administering New Deal social work and employment programs in six states. Dunn was also involved in the formation of many state and county welfare departments after the passing of the Social Security Act by administering “final relief grants” from the emergency FERA funds to establish permanent social services departments. Through the course of this work, Dunn met Eleanor Roosevelt and Lyndon B. Johnson, who would become her long-term colleagues and collaborators.

In 1937, Alabama governor Bibb Graves appointed Dunn as Commissioner of the State Department of Public Welfare. In this capacity, Dunn represented Alabama on national committees for the Children's Bureau of the Department of Labor and at events such as the 1940 White House Conference on Children in a Democracy. From 1940 to 1950, she served as vice president of the Child Welfare League of America and toured Canada and Great Britain to evaluate their welfare programs in the wake of World War II.

Dunn also published articles and book reviews in peer-reviewed journals focused on social work and politics, including a study of the social challenges created by the construction of the Alabama Army Ammunition Plant in Childersburg during World War II. She received two honorary doctorate degrees from Alabama College (later University of Montevallo) and Western College for Women.

From 1948 until 1964, Dunn was the first woman executive director of the American Public Welfare Association, which later became the American Public Human Services Association. In her work for the APWA, Dunn traveled, gave speeches, and liaised between social workers and leaders such as Eleanor Roosevelt, Lyndon B. Johnson, and Nelson Rockefeller to bring about public welfare policies and legislation. She was frequently interviewed in national newspapers about welfare issues and policies.

== Legacy and archives ==
Dunn recorded an oral history interview for Columbia University’s Social Security Administration project. Recordings and a transcript are available on Columbia's website.

Dunn was inducted into the Alabama Women's Hall of Fame in 1982. The University of Minnesota library holds the Loula Dunn papers and the organizational records of the APWA during her period as executive director.
