= Wilson–Finlay House =

Historic house in Alabama, United States

- U.S. National Register of Historic Places
- Alabama Register of Landmarks and Heritage
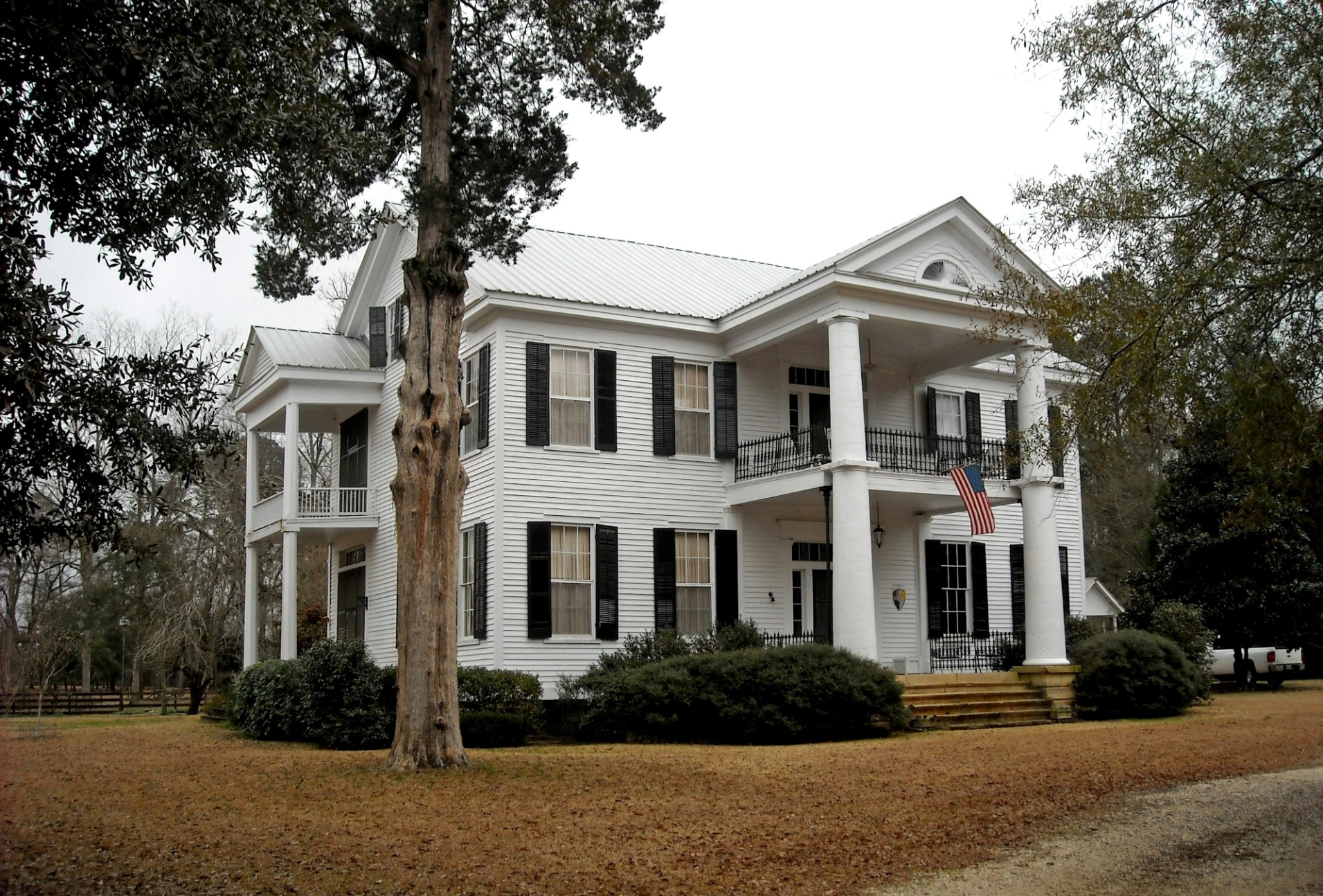

- Location within Alabama Location within the United States
- Nearest city: Gainestown, Alabama
- Coordinates: 31°27′13″N 87°41′28″W
- Area: 2.7 acres (1.1 ha)
- Built: 1846
- Architectural style: Greek Revival
- NRHP reference No.: 78000484

Significant dates
- Added to NRHP: July 12, 1978
- Designated ARLH: September 17, 1976

The Wilson–Finlay House also known as the Joshua Wilson House and the Finlay House, is a historic plantation house in Gainestown, Alabama, United States. It was added to the Alabama Register of Landmarks and Heritage on September 17, 1976. It was placed on the National Register of Historic Places on July 12, 1978, due to its architectural significance.

== History ==
The house was built circa 1846 for Dr. Joshua Sanford Wilson by Isaac Fuller from Maine. Wilson, born in 1792 in Halifax County, North Carolina, was a physician, planter, and politician. His father, the Reverend Joshua Wilson, settled in Gainestown around 1817. He was a Revolutionary War veteran and Methodist minister.

As of 2011, the house is owned by the Louis M. Finlay Jr. family. They also maintain the Gainestown Schoolhouse, another National Register-listed property, on the grounds for use as a guest cottage.

== Architecture ==
The two-story Greek Revival-style house is wood-frame with limestone ashlar foundations and front columns, an unusual feature in Alabama. The limestone, with visible marine fossils present, was quarried locally, at the Gainestown Quarry on the Alabama River. The house is rectangular in form and utilizes a central hall-type plan. A central two-tiered Doric portico fronts the structure. A louvered fanlight is centered in the pediment above the portico.
