= Gainestown Methodist Church and Cemetery =

Historic site in Clarke County, Alabama, US

- U.S. National Register of Historic Places
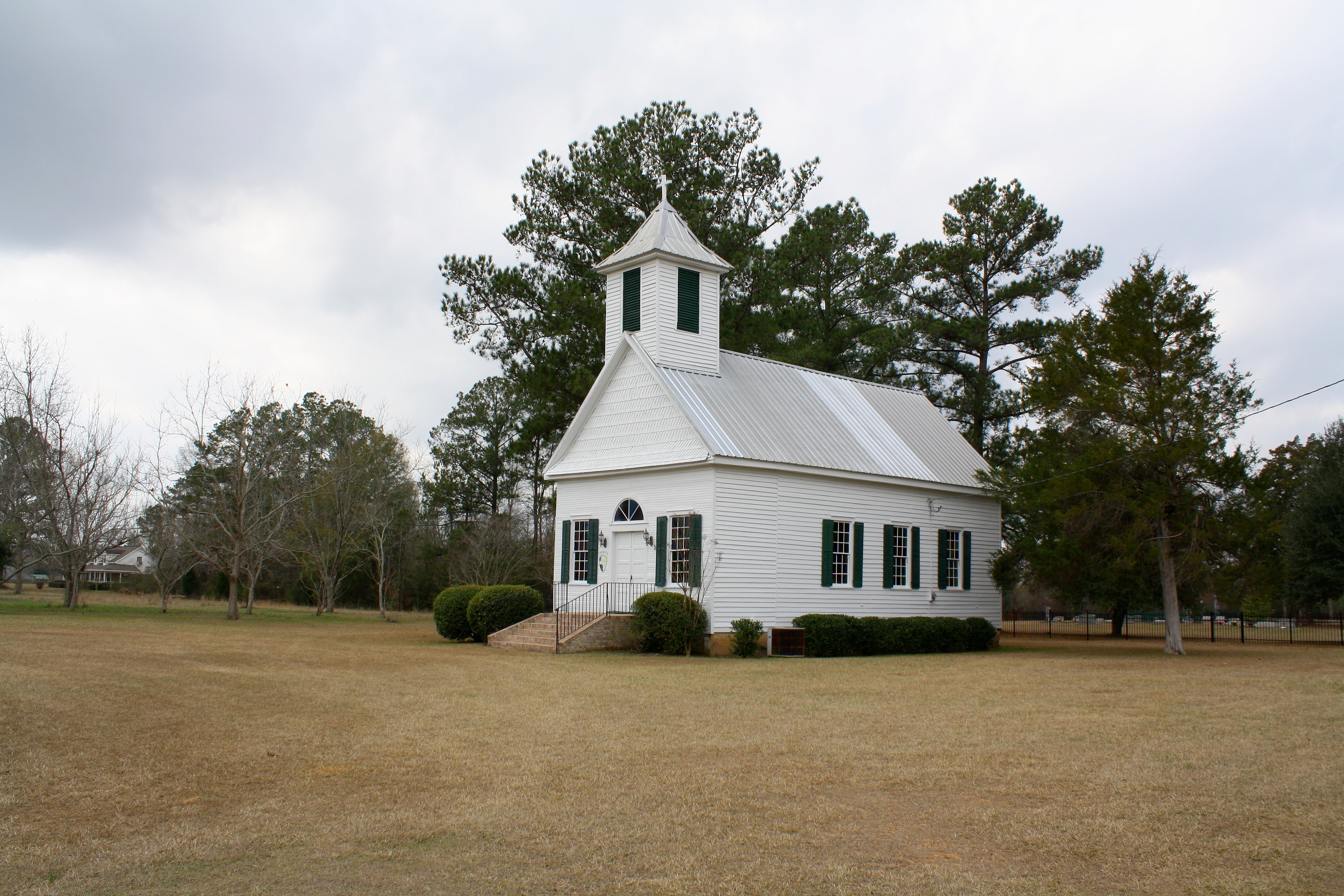

- Location within Alabama Location within the United States
- Nearest city: Gainestown, Alabama
- Coordinates: 31°26′31″N 87°41′40″W
- Area: 2.1 acres (0.85 ha)
- Built: 1911
- Architectural style: Front gable with steeple
- MPS: Clarke County MPS
- NRHP reference No.: 99000889
- Added to NRHP: July 28, 1999

The Gainestown Methodist Church and Cemetery is a historic United Methodist Church building and its adjacent cemetery in Gainestown, Alabama, United States. It was added to the National Register of Historic Places on July 28, 1999, due to its architectural significance.

== History ==
Gainestown Methodist Church was founded in 1819 by Reverend Joshua Wilson. A two-story church building was constructed in 1854 with the church auditorium on the lower floor and a Masonic lodge meeting room on the upper. That building was severely damaged by a tornado in 1911. It was rebuilt in that same year as a one-story building, using as much salvaged material from the original building as was possible.
