= Bush House (Grove Hill, Alabama) =

Historic house in Alabama, United States

- U.S. National Register of Historic Places
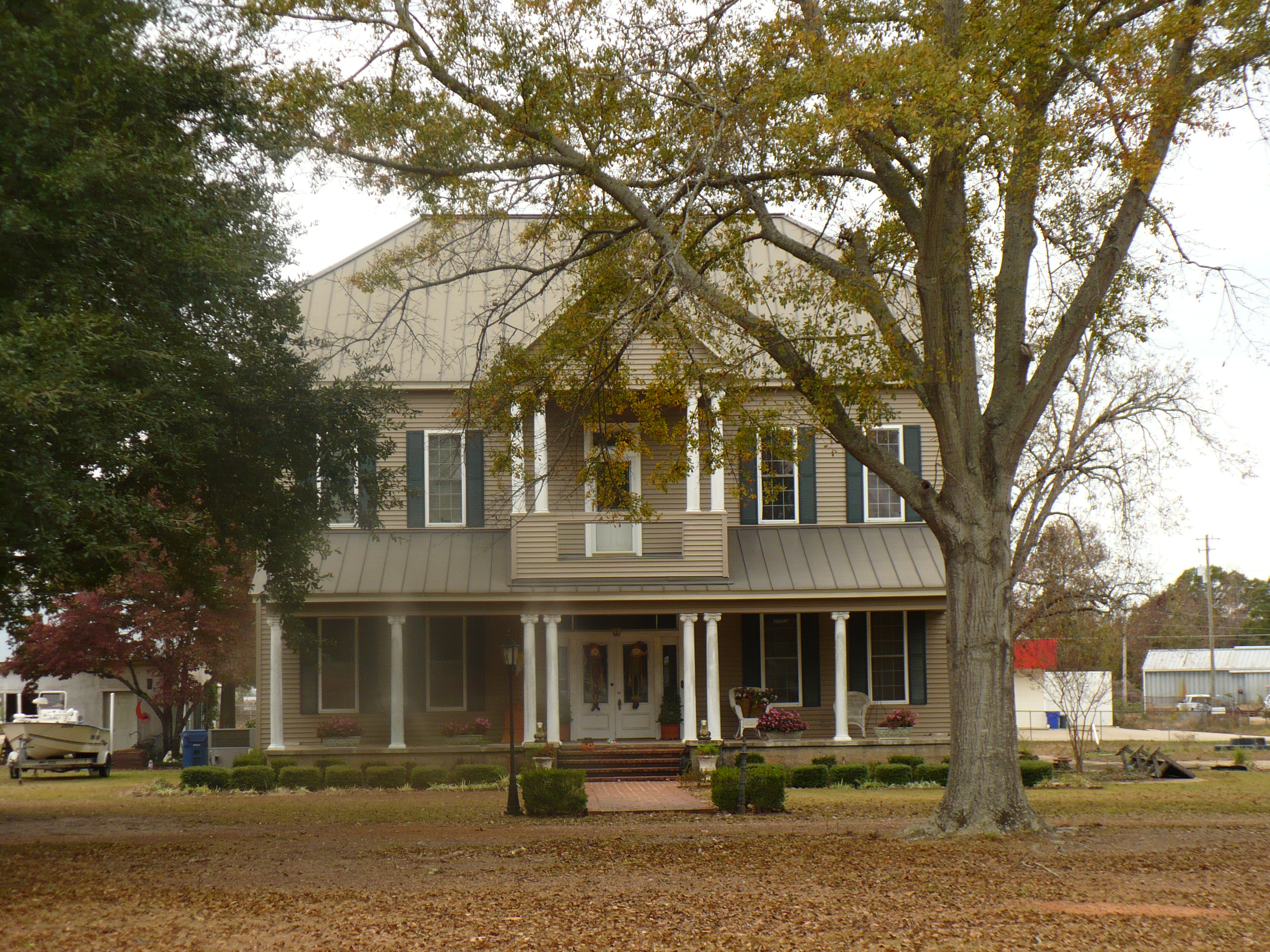
- The Bush House in 2008

- Location within Alabama Location within the United States
- Location: 168 N. Church St., Grove Hill, Alabama
- Coordinates: 31°42′57″N 87°46′32″W
- Built: 1912
- Architect: Preston Randolph Bush
- Architectural style: Colonial Revival
- MPS: Clarke County MPS
- NRHP reference No.: 99000885
- Added to NRHP: July 28, 1999

The Bush House is a historic house in Grove Hill, Alabama, United States. The two-story Colonial Revival style house was built in 1912. It was added to the National Register of Historic Places on July 28, 1999. It was listed due to its architectural significance as a part of the Clark County Multiple Property Submission.
