= Fort White (Alabama) =

United States historic site in Alabama

- Grove Hill, Alabama in United States

Site information
- Type: Stockade fort
- Owner: Private
- Controlled by: Private
- Open to the public: No

Location
- Location within Alabama Location within the United States
- Coordinates: 31°43′40″N 87°45′14″W

Site history
- Built: 1813
- Built by: Mississippi Territory settlers
- In use: 1813
- Battles/wars: Creek War

Fort White, also known as White's Fort, was a stockade fort built in 1813 in present-day Clarke County, Alabama during the Creek War (part of the larger War of 1812). The fort was located northeast of present-day Grove Hill. The fort was possibly named due to the fact that it offered protection to local white settlers. Other sources state it was named for a local settler. Fort White offered protection to the residents of the community that would eventually become Grove Hill from possible Red Stick attacks. Fort White was likely abandoned after the Fort Mims massacre.

Timothy H. Ball visited the site of Fort White prior to writing his history of the Creek War.

== Gallery ==
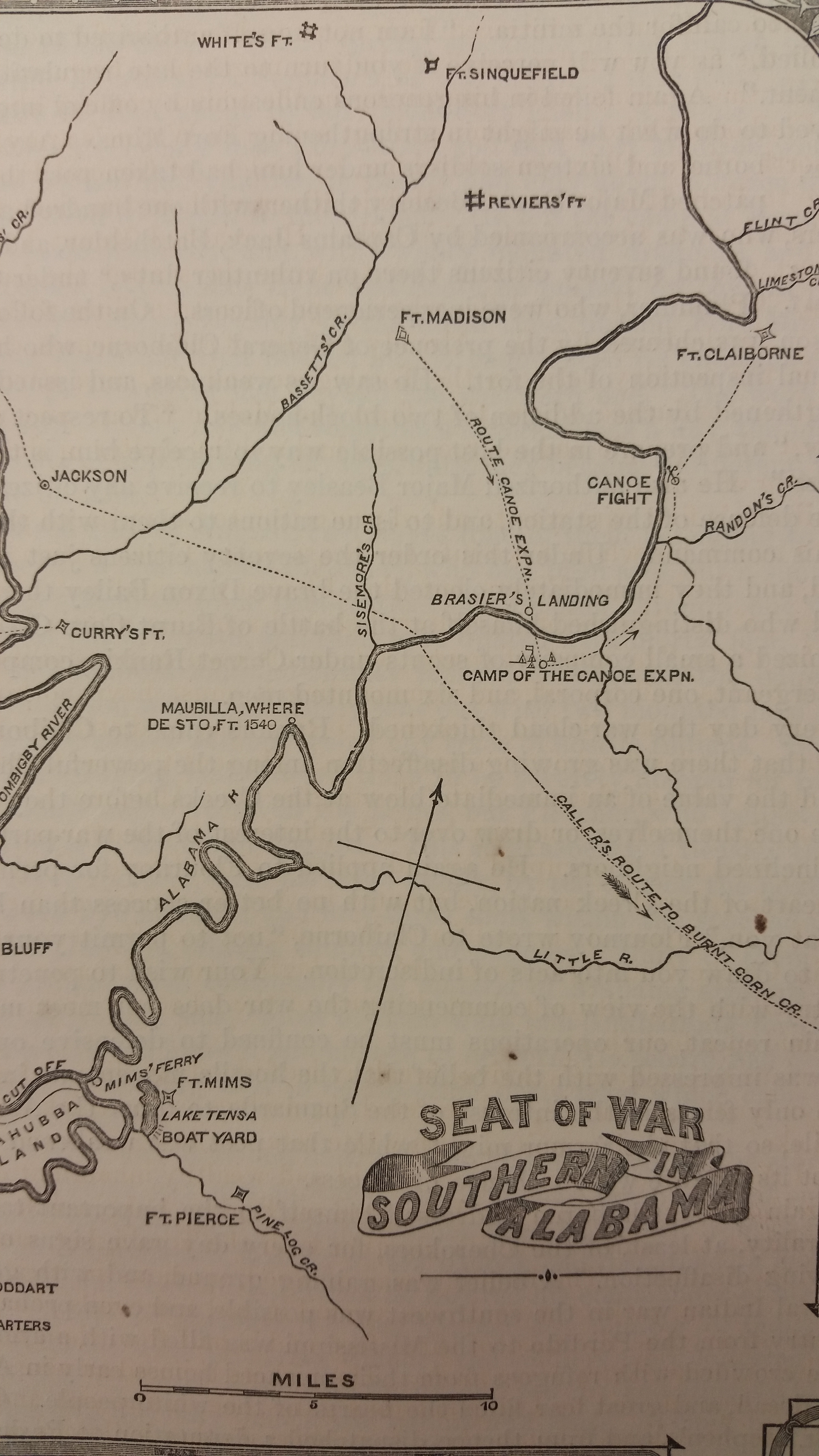
Map of Alabama during the War of 1812. Fort White is located in the upper center.
