= Gainestown Schoolhouse =

- U.S. National Register of Historic Places
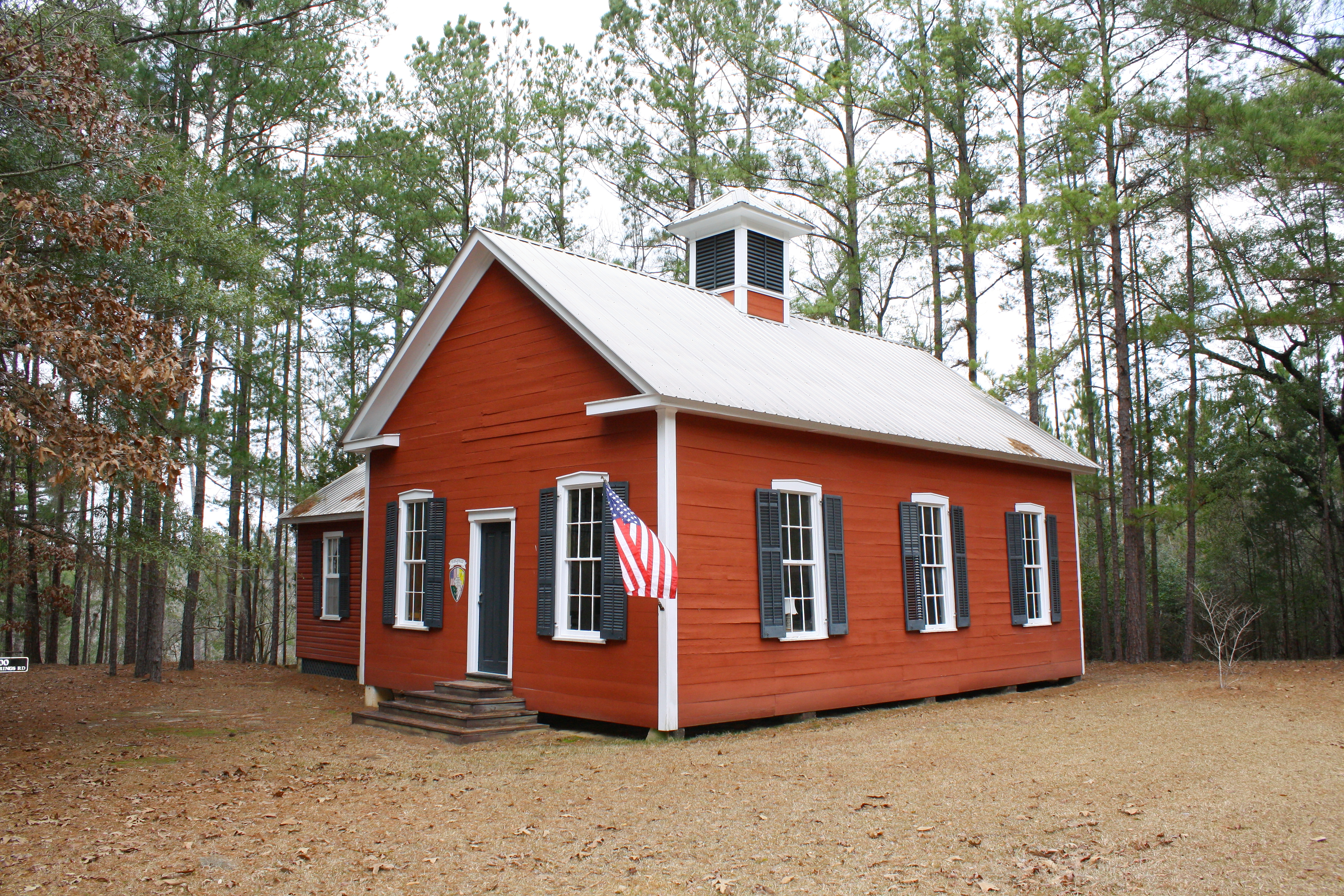

- Location within Alabama Location within the United States
- Nearest city: Gainestown, Alabama
- Coordinates: 31°27′10″N 87°41′33″W
- Area: 2 acres (0.81 ha)
- Built: 1919
- Architectural style: Late 19th and 20th Century Revivals
- NRHP reference No.: 92000033
- Added to NRHP: October 1, 1992

The Gainestown Schoolhouse is a historic school building on Clarke County Road 29 in Gainestown, Alabama, United States. It was built in 1919 as a one-room schoolhouse and now serves as a guesthouse for the Wilson-Finlay House across the road. It was placed on the National Register of Historic Places on October 1, 1992, due to its architectural significance.

== Architecture ==
The form is like that of most late 19th-century school buildings in Alabama, namely a one-story frame, rectangular-shaped building with a front gabled roof. A single entrance is found on the gabled front and a row of windows on each side elevation.

The building was expanded to two rooms in 1930, with the addition of a western side-wing. The large gabled wing turned the schoolhouse into a T-shaped building.
