= Alston–Cobb House =

Historic house in Alabama, United States

- U.S. National Register of Historic Places
- Alabama Register of Landmarks and Heritage
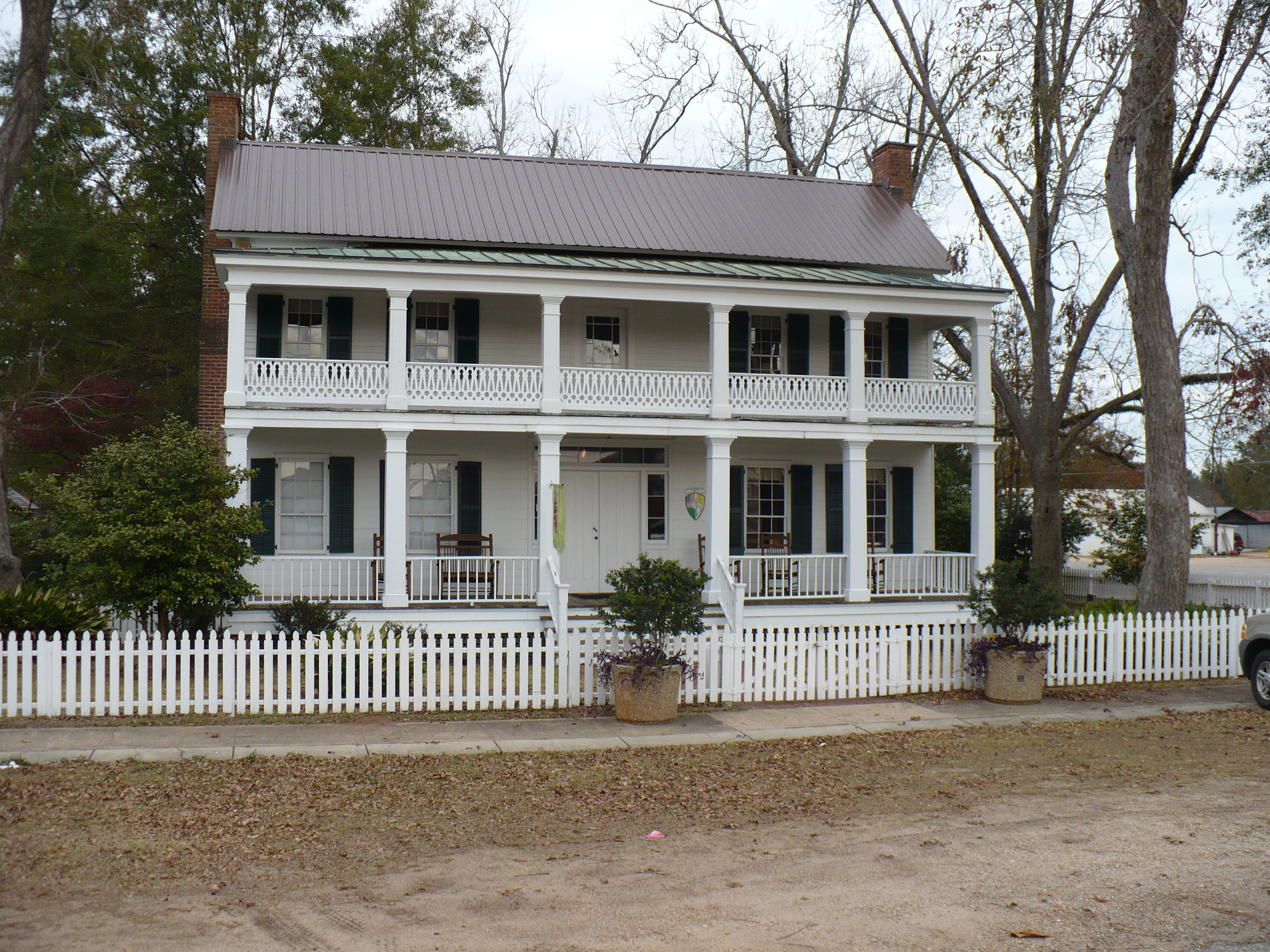
- The Alston–Cobb House in 2008

- Location within Alabama Location within the United States
- Location: Grove Hill, Alabama
- Coordinates: 31°42′36″N 87°46′38″W
- Built: 1854
- Architectural style: Greek Revival
- NRHP reference No.: 79000382

Significant dates
- Added to NRHP: April 30, 1979
- Designated ARLH: September 1, 1978

The Alston–Cobb House, now formally known as the Clarke County Historical Museum, is a historic house and local history museum in Grove Hill, Alabama, United States. It was built in 1854 by Dr. Lemuel Lovett Alston as a Greek Revival I-house, a vernacular style also known in the South as Plantation Plain. It is one of only four examples of an I-house to survive intact in Clarke County. The Alston–Cobb House was added to the Alabama Register of Landmarks and Heritage on September 1, 1978, and to the National Register of Historic Places on April 30, 1979.

== History ==
Lemuel Alston migrated to Grove Hill and began the practice of medicine around 1852. The house was completed in 1854, shortly before his marriage to Sarah French Jackson on November 1, 1854. The house was subsequently owned by the Bettis, Cobb, Bumpers, and Postma families until it was purchased by the Clarke County Historical Society in 1980. The historical society restored the house and opened it as the Clarke County Museum in 1986. The museum features exhibits that cover a broad range of topics from Zeuglodon fossils to the American Civil War and an antebellum kitchen.

== The grounds ==
Several historic structures have been moved to the museum grounds and restored. The Creagh Law Office, built in 1834 by Judge John Gates Creagh, was moved to the site in 1990 and restored. The Turner Corn Crib is a corn crib which is thought to have been partially built from timbers salvaged from Fort Turner, a log fortification that served the area during the Creek War in 1813. It was moved to the grounds in 2001 and restored. The Mathews Cabin was acquired in 2005 and restoration was completed in 2008. It is a log cabin with two large rooms separated by a breezeway, a form often known as a dogtrot house, and dates to the mid-19th century.
