= John A. Coate House =

Historic house in Alabama, United States

- U.S. National Register of Historic Places
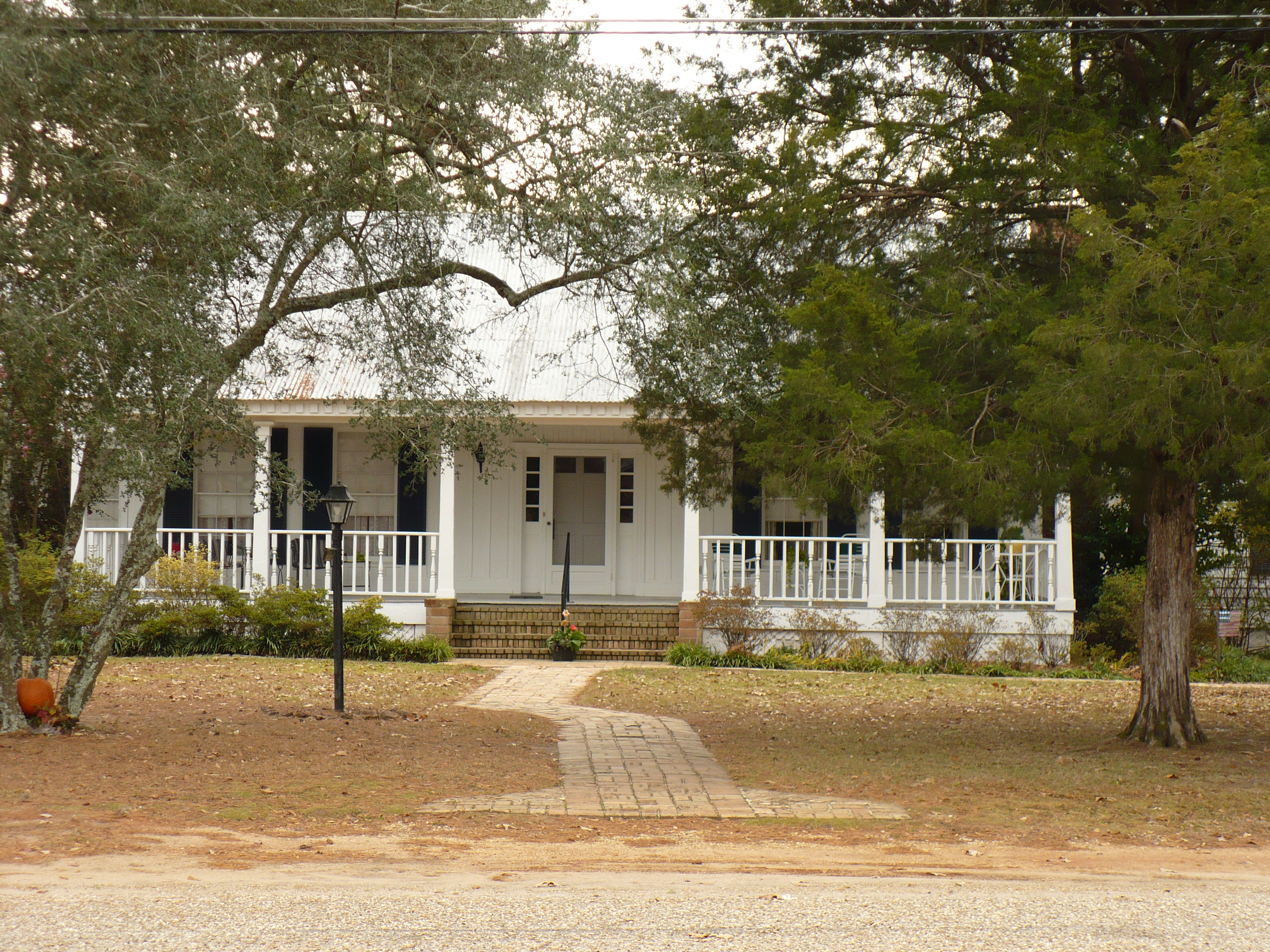
- The house in 2008

- Location within Alabama Location within the United States
- Location: DuBose St., between Church and Crawford Sts., Grove Hill, Alabama
- Coordinates: 31°42′17″N 87°46′29″W
- Built: 1855
- MPS: Clarke County MPS
- NRHP reference No.: 99000887
- Added to NRHP: July 28, 1999

The John A. Coate House is a historic house located in Grove Hill, Alabama, United States.

== Description and history ==
The one-story, spraddle-roof house was built in 1855. It was listed as a landmark due to its architectural significance as a part of the Clarke County Multiple Property Submission.

It was added to the National Register of Historic Places on July 28, 1999.
