= Clarke County Schools =

School district in Alabama

Clarke County School District is a school district in Clarke County, Alabama.

The District includes:

- Gillmore Elementary School
- Grove Hill Elementary
- Jackson Intermediate School
- Jackson Middle School
- Wilson Hall Middle School
- Clarke County High School
- Jackson High School
