= Dickinson House (Grove Hill, Alabama) =

Historic house in Alabama, United States

- U.S. National Register of Historic Places
- Alabama Register of Landmarks and Heritage
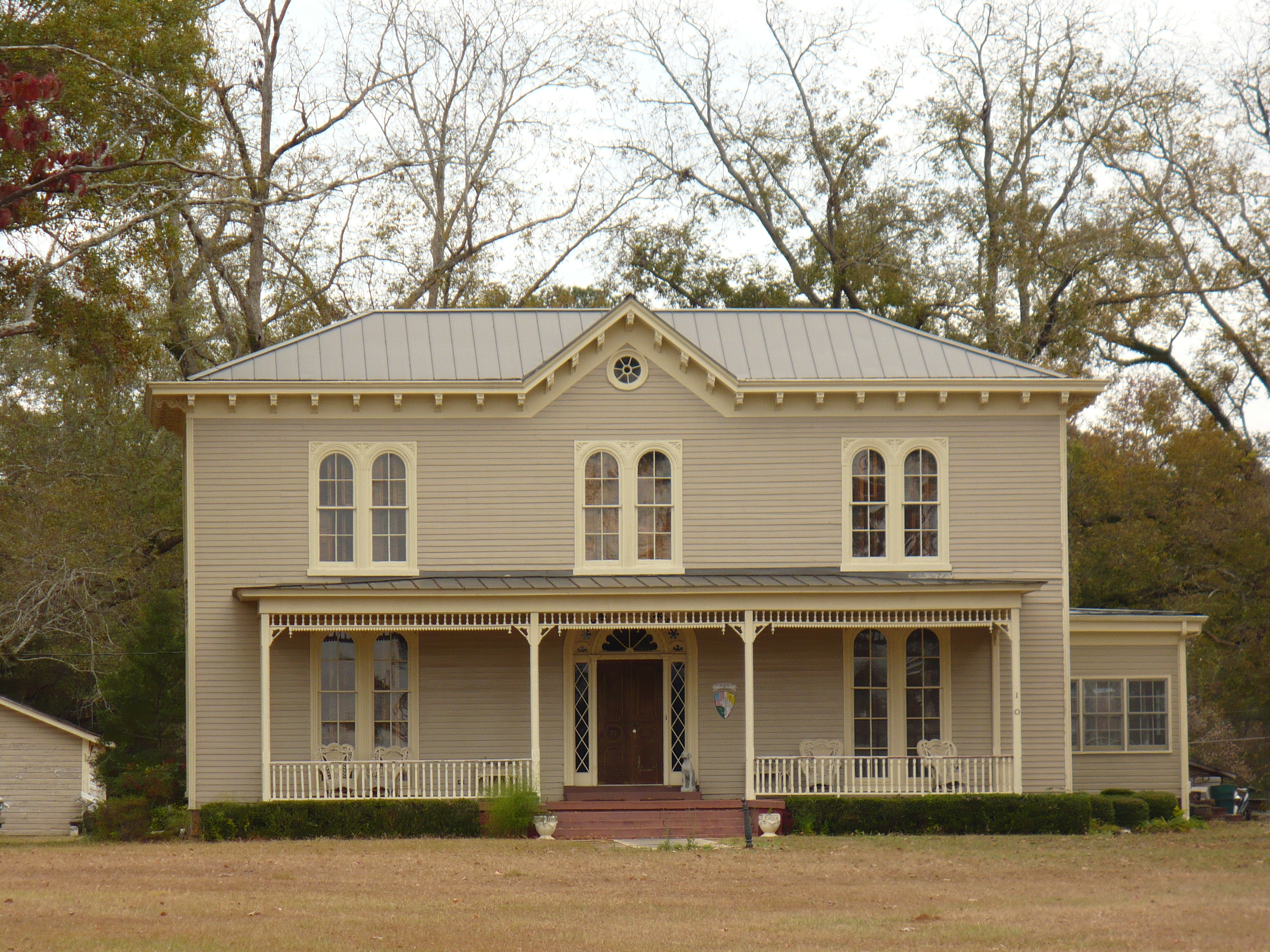
- The Dickinson House in 2008

- Location within Alabama Location within the United States
- Location: 101 Dickinson Avenue, Grove Hill, Alabama
- Coordinates: 31°42′36″N 87°46′21″W
- Built: 1845
- Architect: Newman, James
- Architectural style: Italianate
- NRHP reference No.: 78000485

Significant dates
- Added to NRHP: September 13, 1978
- Designated ARLH: September 13, 1978

The Dickinson House is a historic house in Grove Hill, Alabama, United States. The two-story Italianate style house was built in 1845. It was designed by James Newman. It was added to the Alabama Register of Landmarks and Heritage on January 1, 1978, and to the National Register of Historic Places on September 13, 1978. The house was listed due to its architectural significance as an early example of Italianate architecture.
