= Cobb House (Grove Hill, Alabama) =

Historic house in Alabama, United States

- U.S. National Register of Historic Places
- Alabama Register of Landmarks and Heritage
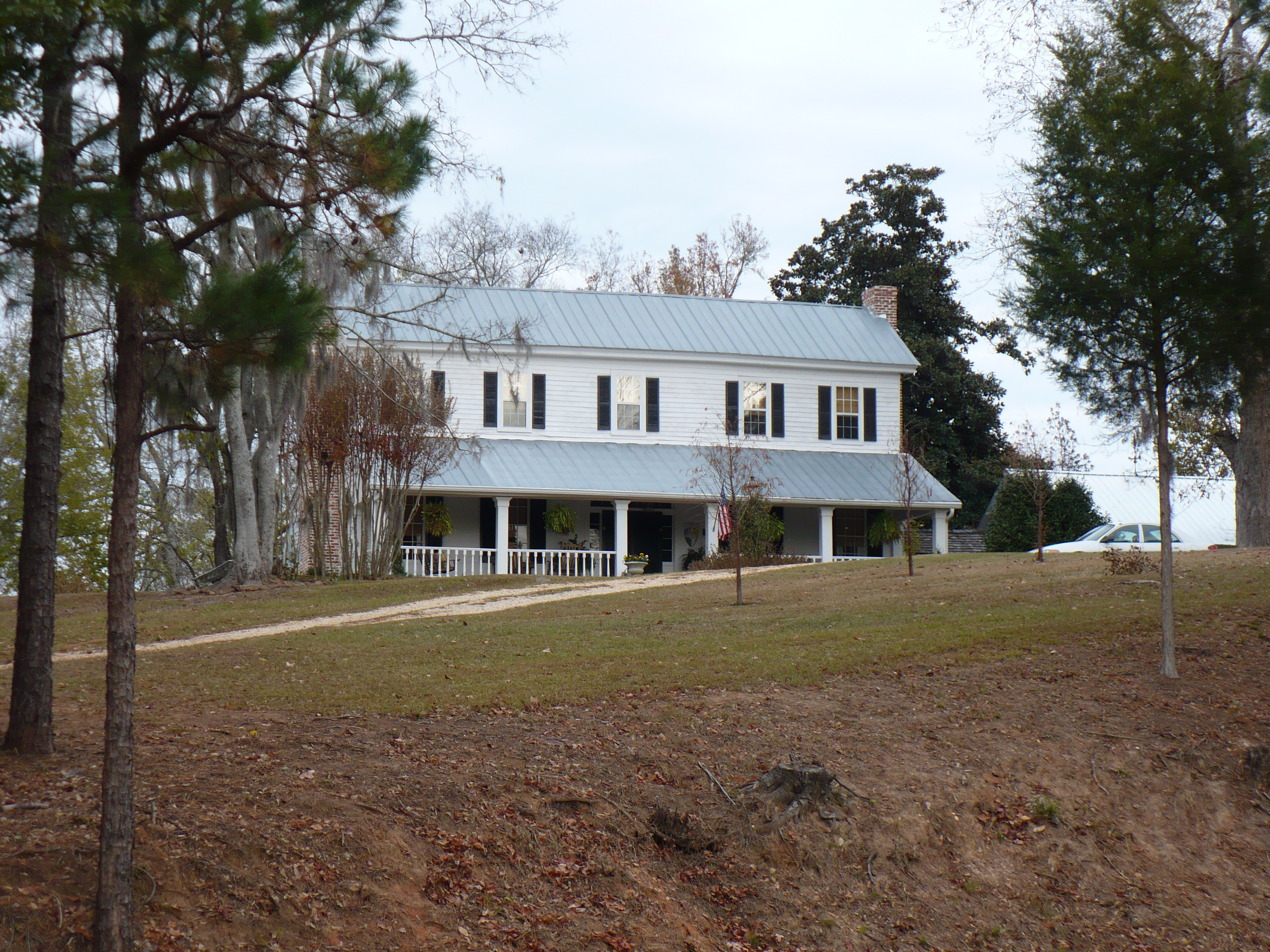
- The Cobb House in 2008

- Location within Alabama Location within the United States
- Nearest city: Grove Hill, Alabama
- Coordinates: 31°42′28″N 87°48′7″W
- Built: 1865
- MPS: Clarke County MPS
- NRHP reference No.: 99000888

Significant dates
- Added to NRHP: July 28, 1999
- Designated ARLH: January 29, 1980

The Cobb House is a historic house near Grove Hill, Alabama, United States. The two-story I-house was built in 1865. It was added to the Alabama Register of Landmarks and Heritage on January 29, 1980, and subsequently to the National Register of Historic Places on July 28, 1999. It was listed due to its architectural significance as a part of the Clarke County Multiple Property Submission.
