= Woodlands (Gosport, Alabama) =

Historic house in Alabama, United States

- U.S. National Register of Historic Places
- Alabama Register of Landmarks and Heritage
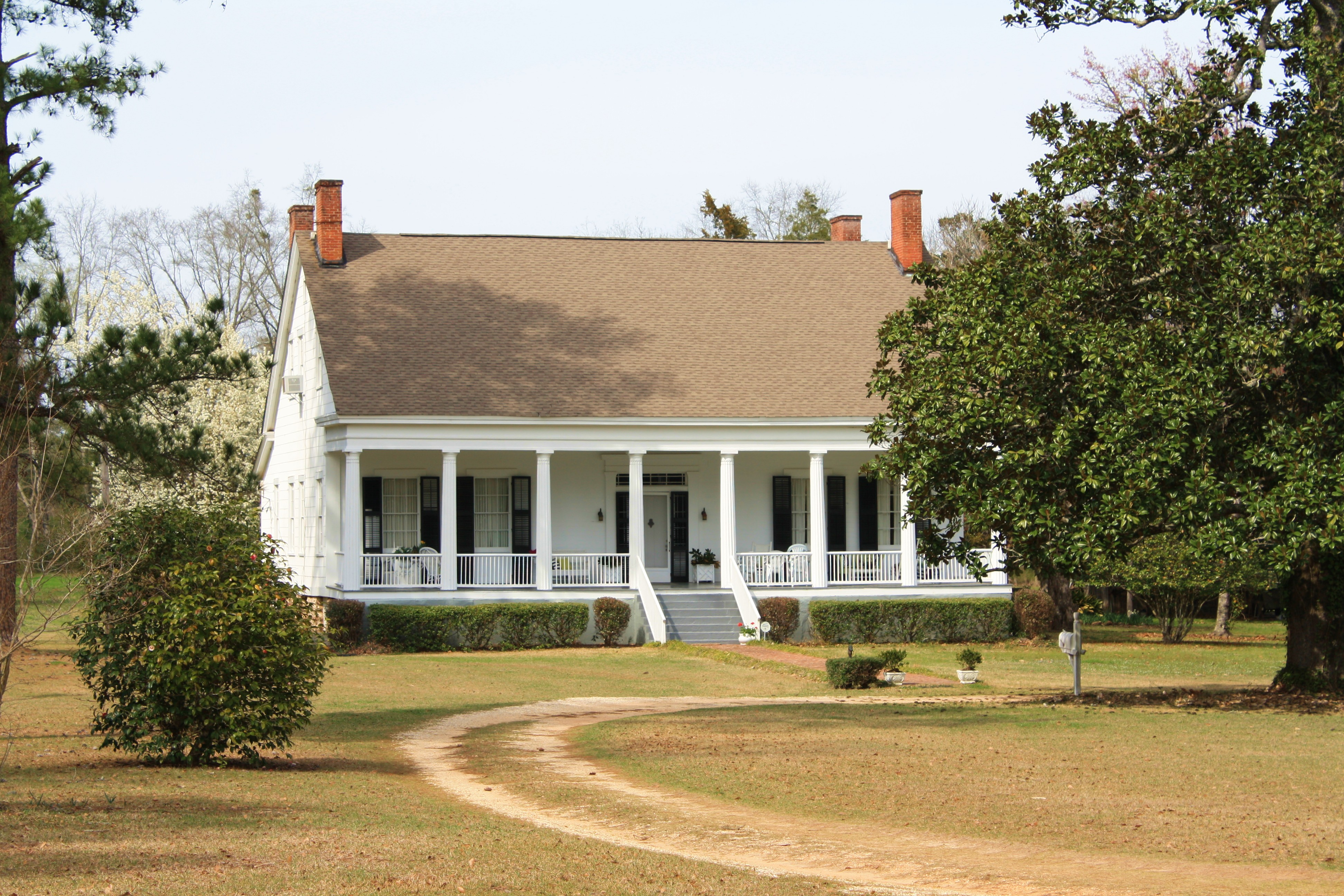

- Location within Alabama Location within the United States
- Location: Off U.S. 84, Gosport, Alabama
- Coordinates: 31°35′3″N 87°34′24″W
- Area: 1 acre (0.40 ha)
- Built: 1840
- Architectural style: Greek Revival, Creole
- NRHP reference No.: 80000683

Significant dates
- Added to NRHP: April 28, 1980
- Designated ARLH: January 29, 1980

Woodlands, also known as the Frederick Blount Plantation, is a historic plantation house in Gosport, Alabama, United States. The house was added to the National Register of Historic Places on April 28, 1980, due to its architectural significance.

== Background ==
The house was built by Frederick Spaight Blount in 1840. Blount was born on November 13, 1808, in North Carolina. He and his half-brother, James W. Bryan, entered into a partnership in 1841, by which Bryan furnished slaves for Woodlands. Blount was noted to be a lawyer in Gosport in 1845. The partnership with his half-brother had soured by 1848, with Bryan attempting to sell the slaves to Alfred Hatch of Greensboro. By the time of the 1850 United States census he and his wife, Emily James, were living at the plantation with three children and eighteen slaves. The family relocated to Mobile a few years later, where Blount resumed his law practice.

A great scandal, known nationwide at the time, arose in 1858 when Frederick S. Blount accused Henri Arnous de Rivière, a French Army officer, of abducting his daughter, Miss Emily J. Blount, and wife, Mrs. Emily James Blount, and attempting to flee with them to Havana. Blount had allowed the engagement of his daughter to Rivière, but after discovering a supposed previous marriage broke the engagement and forbade Henri Rivière contact with her. Rivière was apprehended on July 4, 1858, at the Hotel Napoleon in Hoboken, New Jersey, but he and Blount's daughter escaped prior to the trial.

The affair was published in newspapers throughout the South, and in The New York Times. The Blount family was later reunited and were again living in Mobile in 1860. However, Rivière and Miss Blount did eventually marry and have children, living in France. Frederick Blount himself was living in Paris by 1872.

== Architecture ==
Woodlands is a wood-frame example of what is known regionally as a Carolina cottage, a form that is very similar in outward appearance to that of a Creole cottage. This form is always one-and-a-half stories with side-gables, with the main roof covering any porches.

The house also features fine Greek Revival detailing, including eight fluted Doric columns supporting the front porch. The front entrance door, centered in the five-bay facade, is surrounded by sidelights and surmounted by a transom light, with these flanked by pilasters and crowned with a simple entablature.
