= Helen G. Edmonds =

American scholar (1911–1995)

- Born: December 3, 1911; Lawrenceville, Virginia, US
- Died: May 9, 1995 (aged 83); Durham, North Carolina, US
- Occupation: Professor
- Board member of: United Negro College Fund NAACP Legal Defense and Education Fund

Academic background
- Education: Morgan State College (BA) Ohio State University (MA, PhD)
- Thesis: The Negro and Fusion Politics in North Carolina, 1894-1901

Academic work
- Discipline: History
- Institutions: North Carolina Central University

Helen Grey Edmonds (December 3, 1911 – May 9, 1995) was an American historian, scholar, and civic leader. She was the first African-American woman to earn a doctorate from Ohio State University, to become a graduate school dean and the first to second the nomination of a United States presidential candidate.

== Early life and education ==
Edmonds was born on December 3, 1911, in Lawrenceville, Virginia, to John Edward and Ann Williams Edmonds. She had a sister, Lucille, and a brother, Harry. Edmonds attended Saint Paul's High School and Junior College in Lawrenceville.

Edmonds attended Morgan State College in Baltimore, graduating in 1933 with a B.A. in History. She went on to receive an M.A. in History at Ohio State University in 1938, followed by a Ph.D. in 1946. She was the first black woman to earn a Ph.D. at that institution. Her dissertation, The Negro and Fusion Politics in North Carolina, 1894–1901, was published as her first book in 1951. From 1954 to 1955, Edmonds conducted postdoctoral research at the University of Heidelberg in West Germany.

== Career ==
From 1934 to 1935, Edmonds taught history, Latin, and Greek at the Virginia Theological Seminary and College in Lynchburg, Virginia. Edmonds joined the faculty of North Carolina College (now North Carolina Central University) in 1941, teaching there until her retirement in 1977. She served in many positions at that institution, including professor of history (1941–77), chair of the Department of History (1963–64), and Dean of the Graduate School of Arts and Sciences (1964–71). In 1989, a classroom building on the campus was named in her honor.

During her career, Edmonds lectured at over 100 colleges and universities in the United States and abroad. She served on the Board of Trustees for several institutions, including North Carolina Central University (after her retirement), Saint Paul's College, and Voorhees College. She received eight honorary degrees during her lifetime.

From 1970 to 1974, Edmonds served as president of The Links, Inc., an organization primarily for African American women. She served on the board of directors of numerous organizations, including the United Negro College Fund and the NAACP Legal Defense and Education Fund.

== Civic service and political activities ==
Edmonds was active in the Republican Party. At the 1956 Republican National Convention, she seconded the nomination of Dwight D. Eisenhower, becoming the first black woman to second the nomination of a U.S. presidential candidate.

In 1970, Edmonds served as an alternate delegate to the General Assembly of the United Nations. She chaired the United States delegation to the Third Committee of the United Nations, and was appointed to the National Advisory Council of the Peace Corps by President Richard Nixon. Nixon cited Edmonds for her service.

== Death ==
Edmonds died at Duke University Hospital in Durham, North Carolina, on May 9, 1995, at the age of 83.

== Selected publications ==
- Helen G. Edmonds (1951). The Negro and Fusion Politics in North Carolina, 1894-1901. University of North Carolina Press. ISBN 1469610957.
- Helen G. Edmonds (1971). Black Faces in High Places: Negroes in Government. Harcourt Brace Jovanovich. ISBN 9780153710735.

== Selected awards and recognition ==
- University Distinguished Professor, North Carolina Central University
- Eight honorary degrees
- Award of Scholarly Distinction, American Historical Association
- Distinguished Woman of North Carolina
- 1975 – O. Max Gardner Award for the "greatest contribution to the welfare of the human race"
- 1977 – Helen G. Edmonds Graduate Colloquium of History – annual conference established by her former students
- 1982 – Candace Award, History
