= Grove Hill, Alabama =

City in Clarke County, Alabama

- Town
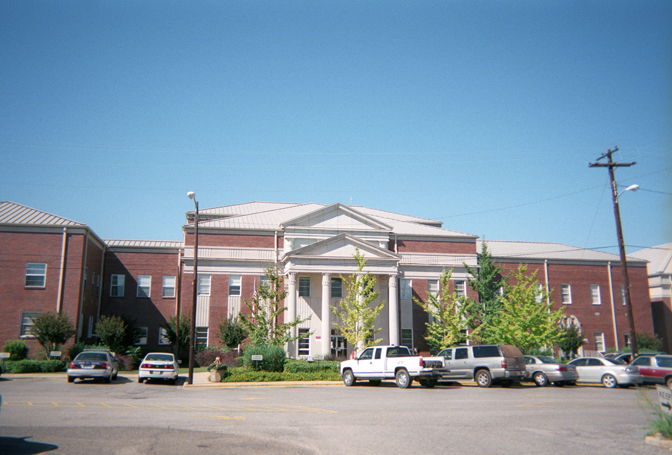
- Clarke County Courthouse in Grove Hill

- Seal

- Location of Grove Hill in Clarke County, Alabama.
- Coordinates: 31°41′22″N 87°45′42″W
- Country: United States
- State: Alabama
- County: Clarke

Government
  - Type: Mayor/Council

Area
  - Total: 7.60 sq mi (19.68 km^{2})
  - Land: 7.59 sq mi (19.66 km^{2})
  - Water: 0.0077 sq mi (0.02 km^{2})
- Elevation: 489 ft (149 m)

Population (2020)
  - Total: 1,818
  - Density: 239.5/sq mi (92.48/km^{2})
- Time zone: UTC-6 (Central (CST))
  - Summer (DST): UTC-5 (CDT)
- ZIP code: 36451
- Area code: 251
- FIPS code: 01-32080
- GNIS feature ID: 2406623
- Website: https://townofgrovehillalabama.com/

Grove Hill is a town in Clarke County, Alabama, United States. At the 2020 census, the population was 1,818. It is the county seat of Clarke County and home of the Clarke County Museum.

== History ==
The area that is now Grove Hill was originally inhabited by Creek and Choctaw Indians. During the Creek War, settlers in the community sought protection in Fort White. The county seat of Clarke County was established at what later became Grove Hill in 1832 as the spot was most central to the rest of the county. Known variously as Smithville, then Macon, the name Grove Hill was selected around 1850 for the large grove of oak trees on the plateau. The town was officially incorporated and chartered in 1929. The 1853 yellow fever epidemic struck the town, killing many residents, almost wiping out the town.

The Grove Hill area has numerous sites on the National Register of Historic Places including the Alston-Cobb House, Bush House, John A. Coate House, Cobb House, Dickinson House, Fort Sinquefield, and the Grove Hill Courthouse Square Historic District.

== Geography ==
According to the U.S. Census Bureau, the town has a total area of 5.0 square miles (13 km^{2}), all land.

=== Climate ===
According to the Köppen climate classification, Grove Hill has a humid subtropical climate (abbreviated Cfa).

Climate data for Grove Hill, 1991–2020 simulated normals (505 ft elevation)
Month	Jan	Feb	Mar	Apr	May	Jun	Jul	Aug	Sep	Oct	Nov	Dec	Year
Mean daily maximum °F (°C)	57.6 (14.2)	62.2 (16.8)	69.4 (20.8)	76.3 (24.6)	83.5 (28.6)	88.7 (31.5)	90.9 (32.7)	90.3 (32.4)	86.4 (30.2)	77.7 (25.4)	67.3 (19.6)	59.7 (15.4)	75.8 (24.3)
Daily mean °F (°C)	46.9 (8.3)	51.1 (10.6)	57.7 (14.3)	64.6 (18.1)	72.7 (22.6)	79.0 (26.1)	81.1 (27.3)	80.4 (26.9)	76.1 (24.5)	66.7 (19.3)	56.1 (13.4)	49.1 (9.5)	65.1 (18.4)
Mean daily minimum °F (°C)	36.5 (2.5)	40.1 (4.5)	46.2 (7.9)	53.1 (11.7)	61.7 (16.5)	69.1 (20.6)	71.4 (21.9)	70.5 (21.4)	65.8 (18.8)	55.9 (13.3)	44.8 (7.1)	38.7 (3.7)	54.5 (12.5)
Average precipitation inches (mm)	5.60 (142.17)	5.14 (130.58)	5.56 (141.15)	4.35 (110.61)	4.10 (104.15)	5.73 (145.59)	6.45 (163.93)	5.14 (130.53)	4.45 (113.06)	3.59 (91.24)	4.39 (111.55)	5.82 (147.75)	60.32 (1,532.31)
Average dew point °F (°C)	38.8 (3.8)	42.4 (5.8)	47.5 (8.6)	54.1 (12.3)	62.1 (16.7)	69.1 (20.6)	71.8 (22.1)	71.1 (21.7)	66.9 (19.4)	57.6 (14.2)	48.0 (8.9)	41.9 (5.5)	55.9 (13.3)
Source: Prism Climate Group

== Demographics ==
Historical population
Census	Pop.	Note	%±
1870	200		—
1880	176		−12.0%
1890	225		27.8%
1930	491		—
1940	730		48.7%
1950	1,443		97.7%
1960	1,834		27.1%
1970	1,825		−0.5%
1980	1,912		4.8%
1990	1,551		−18.9%
2000	1,438		−7.3%
2010	1,570		9.2%
2020	1,818		15.8%
U.S. Decennial Census; 2013 Estimate

=== Racial and ethnic composition ===
Grove Hill town, Alabama – Racial and ethnic composition Note: the US Census treats Hispanic/Latino as an ethnic category. This table excludes Latinos from the racial categories and assigns them to a separate category. Hispanics/Latinos may be of any race. Hispanics/Latinos may be of any race. Race and ethnicity was not reported in Alabama for populations under 2,500 in the 1980 census and under 1,000 in 1990 census.
Race / Ethnicity (NH = Non-Hispanic)	Pop 1990	Pop 2000	Pop 2010	Pop 2020	% 1990	% 2000	% 2010	% 2020
White alone (NH)	973	889	873	938	62.73%	61.82%	55.61%	51.60%
Black or African American alone (NH)	558	536	646	790	35.98%	37.27%	41.15%	43.45%
Native American or Alaska Native alone (NH)	7	3	3	12	0.45%	0.21%	0.19%	0.66%
Asian alone (NH)	8	0	5	13	0.52%	0.00%	0.32%	0.72%
Native Hawaiian or Pacific Islander alone (NH)	x	0	0	0	x	0.00%	0.00%	0.00%
Other race alone (NH)	0	0	2	7	0.00%	0.00%	0.13%	0.39%
Mixed race or Multiracial (NH)	x	5	10	36	x	0.35%	0.64%	1.98%
Hispanic or Latino (any race)	5	5	31	22	0.32%	0.35%	1.97%	1.21%
Total	1,551	1,438	1,570	1,818	100.00%	100.00%	100.00%	100.00%

=== 2020 census ===
As of the 2020 census, Grove Hill had a population of 1,818. There were 741 households and 467 families residing in the town.

The median age was 41.8 years. 21.7% of residents were under the age of 18 and 18.6% were 65 years of age or older. For every 100 females there were 89.4 males, and for every 100 females age 18 and over there were 85.7 males age 18 and over.

0.0% of residents lived in urban areas, while 100.0% lived in rural areas.

Of households, 31.4% had children under the age of 18 living in them. Of all households, 40.2% were married-couple households, 17.5% were households with a male householder and no spouse or partner present, and 38.5% were households with a female householder and no spouse or partner present. About 30.0% of all households were made up of individuals, and 15.2% had someone living alone who was 65 years of age or older.

There were 866 housing units, of which 14.4% were vacant. The homeowner vacancy rate was 2.5% and the rental vacancy rate was 4.0%.

=== 2010 census ===
As of the census of 2010, there were 1,570 people, 615 households, and 402 families residing in the town. The racial makeup of the town was 56.6% White, 41.3% Black or African American, 0.3% Native American, 0.5% from other races, and 1.0% from two or more races. 2.0% of the population were Hispanic or Latino of any race.

There were 582 households, out of which 30.6% had children under the age of 18 living with them, 41.5% were married couples living together, 21.0% had a female householder with no husband present, and 34.6% were non-families. 31.9% of all households were made up of individuals, and 14.8% had someone living alone who was 65 years of age or older. The average household size was 2.36 and the average family size was 2.99.

In the town, the population was spread out, with 23.9% under the age of 18, 8.0% from 18 to 24, 26.0% from 25 to 44, 25.8% from 45 to 64, and 16.2% who were 65 years of age or older. The median age was 38.5 years. For every 100 females, there were 98.2 males. For every 100 females age 18 and over, there were 107.3 males.

== Education ==
Public Education is provided by the Clarke County Schools. Located in Grove Hill are Clarke County High School (grades 9 through 12), Wilson Hall Middle School (grades 5 through 8), and Grove Hill Elementary School (grades K though 4).

There is one private school in Grove Hill. Clarke Preparatory School provides education for grades K through 12.

== Media ==
=== Radio station ===
WBMH 106.1 FM (Classic Country)

== Notable people ==
- Lemuel J. Alston, U.S. Representative from South Carolina
- Doug Barfield – Auburn University football coach
- Zechariah Bettis, politician and Probate Judge of Clarke County, Alabama
- John W. Cranford – Representative for Texas.
- Loula Friend Dunn, social worker, and first woman executive of the American Public Welfare Association.
- Grant Gillis – Major League Baseball player
- Wes Goodwin - Defensive Coordinator at Clemson
- Marc Keahey, Democratic member of the Alabama Senate
- F. David Mathews – United States Secretary of Health, Education, and Welfare
- Cliff Nobles – Pop musician
