= Clarke Preparatory School =

Segregation academy in Alabama

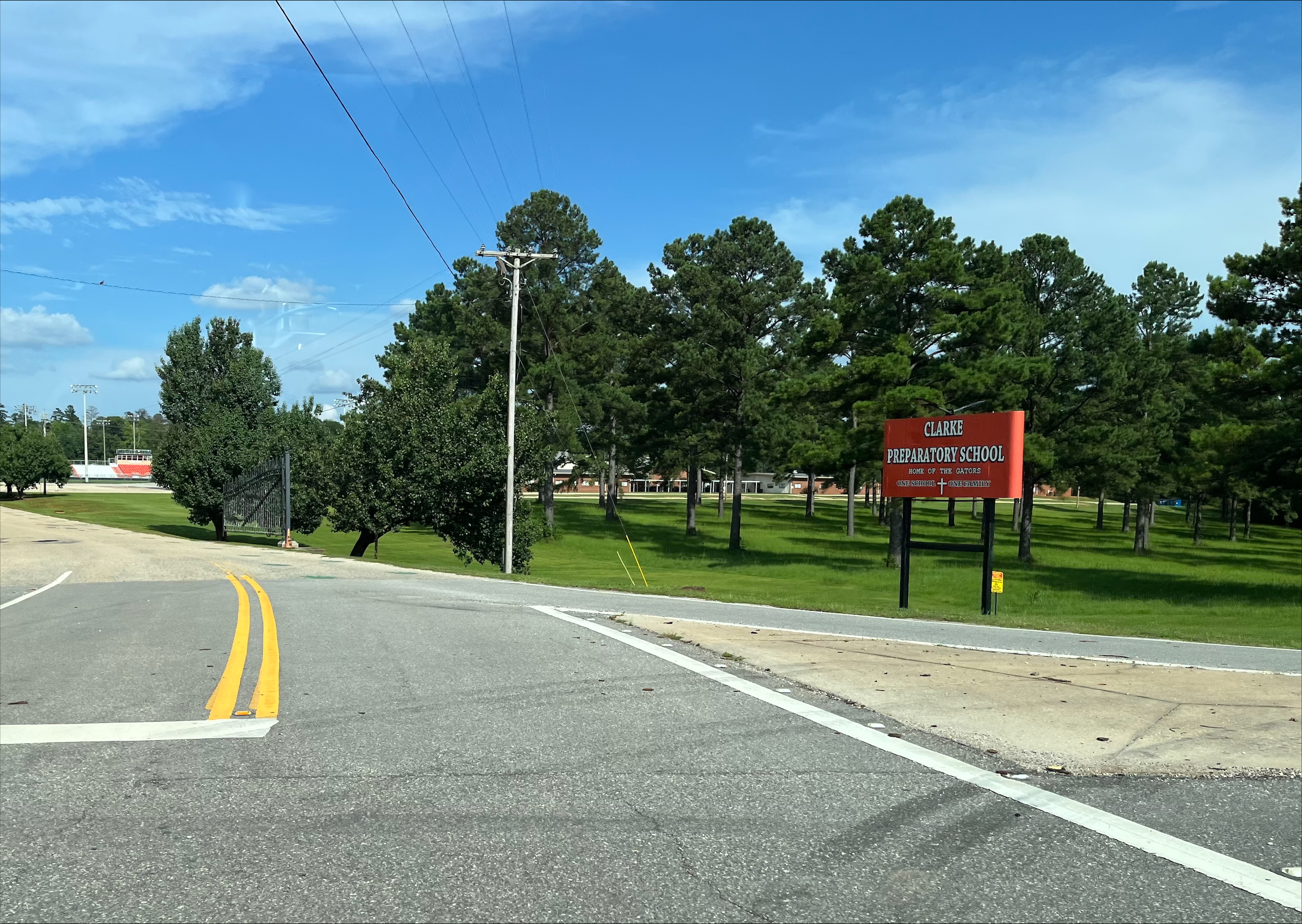
- School sign with building in the distance

Location
- Grove Hill, Alabama; 31.7348221°N 87.7637912°W

Information
- Former name: Grove Hill Academy (1970-1996)
- Type: Private
- Founded: 1970
- Grades: PK-12
- Enrollment: 298
- Website: www.cpsgators.com

Clarke Preparatory School is a private PK-12 school in Grove Hill, Alabama.

== History ==
Grove Hill Academy was founded in 1970 by the Clarke School Foundation Inc. as a segregation academy. In 1972, Grove Hill was accredited by the Alabama Private School Association, which had been founded to accredit segregation academies. The school attracted the attention of the United States Commission on Civil Rights, prompting an inspection tour in 1982, along with eight other schools in Alabama The school's sponsor, the Clarke School Foundation Inc. was granted tax exempt status in September 1995. The school initially operated out of the abandoned Grove Hill Hospital. The old hospital building where the school stood burned on April 7, 1996. The name was changed from Grove Hill Academy to Clarke Preparatory School in the 1999-2000 school year. The school's teams were initially known as the Rebels, but later renamed the Gators.
