= Whatley, Alabama =

- Census-designated place
- Location of Whatley in Clarke County, Alabama.
- Coordinates: 31°38′47″N 87°42′39″W
- Country: United States
- State: Alabama
- County: Clarke

Area
  - Total: 1.29 sq mi (3.34 km^{2})
  - Land: 1.29 sq mi (3.34 km^{2})
  - Water: 0 sq mi (0.00 km^{2})
- Elevation: 167 ft (51 m)

Population (2020)
  - Total: 167
  - Density: 129.3/sq mi (49.94/km^{2})
- Time zone: UTC-6 (Central (CST))
  - Summer (DST): UTC-5 (CDT)
- Area code: 251
- GNIS ID: 2628609

Whatley is a census-designated place in Clarke County, Alabama, United States. As of the 2020 census, Whatley had a population of 167. It has one site on the National Register of Historic Places, the Whatley Historic District.

== History ==
The community is named for the family of Franklin Benjamin Whatley, who donated the land for a railroad depot. In 1888, Whatley had two stores, a doctor's office, two sawmills, a cotton gin, and a hotel. The community continued to grow due to its importance as a shipping point for local lumber products and by the 1920s was home to a school and church.

Whatley was previously an incorporated community in 1901 and recorded a population of 187 according to the 1910 U.S. Census. It did not report any population figure again until 2010 when it became a census-designated place.

During the racial violence of the Red Summer of 1919, three people in Whatley were wounded after a gun battle that took place on August 1, 1919.

== Geography ==
Whatley is located southeast of the center of Clarke County.

=== Climate ===
Climate data for Whatley, Alabama, 1991–2020 normals, extremes 1956–2007
Month	Jan	Feb	Mar	Apr	May	Jun	Jul	Aug	Sep	Oct	Nov	Dec	Year
Record high °F (°C)	84 (29)	86 (30)	92 (33)	92 (33)	98 (37)	104 (40)	104 (40)	103 (39)	101 (38)	95 (35)	88 (31)	83 (28)	104 (40)
Mean daily maximum °F (°C)	59.2 (15.1)	62.8 (17.1)	70.6 (21.4)	77.0 (25.0)	83.7 (28.7)	88.7 (31.5)	90.6 (32.6)	91.4 (33.0)	87.1 (30.6)	78.0 (25.6)	68.4 (20.2)	60.7 (15.9)	76.5 (24.7)
Daily mean °F (°C)	46.3 (7.9)	50.2 (10.1)	57.2 (14.0)	64.2 (17.9)	71.8 (22.1)	78.1 (25.6)	80.4 (26.9)	80.5 (26.9)	76.0 (24.4)	65.4 (18.6)	55.5 (13.1)	48.9 (9.4)	64.5 (18.1)
Mean daily minimum °F (°C)	33.3 (0.7)	37.6 (3.1)	43.8 (6.6)	51.4 (10.8)	59.9 (15.5)	67.5 (19.7)	70.1 (21.2)	69.7 (20.9)	65.0 (18.3)	52.8 (11.6)	42.6 (5.9)	37.0 (2.8)	52.6 (11.4)
Record low °F (°C)	−2 (−19)	6 (−14)	13 (−11)	26 (−3)	34 (1)	40 (4)	50 (10)	51 (11)	35 (2)	25 (−4)	14 (−10)	2 (−17)	−2 (−19)
Average precipitation inches (mm)	5.52 (140)	5.19 (132)	5.84 (148)	4.31 (109)	4.10 (104)	5.76 (146)	6.24 (158)	5.48 (139)	3.88 (99)	4.10 (104)	4.46 (113)	6.50 (165)	61.38 (1,557)
Average snowfall inches (cm)	0.2 (0.51)	0.0 (0.0)	0.0 (0.0)	0.0 (0.0)	0.0 (0.0)	0.0 (0.0)	0.0 (0.0)	0.0 (0.0)	0.0 (0.0)	0.0 (0.0)	0.0 (0.0)	0.2 (0.51)	0.4 (1.02)
Average precipitation days (≥ 0.01 in)	9.7	8.2	8.0	6.5	6.2	9.8	11.3	8.7	6.8	6.1	7.4	7.5	96.2
Average snowy days (≥ 0.1 in)	0.1	0.0	0.0	0.0	0.0	0.0	0.0	0.0	0.0	0.0	0.0	0.1	0.2
Source 1: NOAA
Source 2: XMACIS2

== Demographics ==
Historical population
Census	Pop.	Note	%±
1910	187		—
2010	150		—
2020	167		11.3%
U.S. Decennial Census

Whatley was listed as a census designated place in the 2010 U.S. census.

Whatley CDP, Alabama – Racial and ethnic composition Note: the US Census treats Hispanic/Latino as an ethnic category. This table excludes Latinos from the racial categories and assigns them to a separate category. Hispanics/Latinos may be of any race.
Race / Ethnicity (NH = Non-Hispanic)	Pop 2010	Pop 2020	% 2010	% 2020
White alone (NH)	105	99	70.00%	59.28%
Black or African American alone (NH)	40	57	26.67%	34.13%
Native American or Alaska Native alone (NH)	0	0	0.00%	0.00%
Asian alone (NH)	1	1	0.67%	0.60%
Native Hawaiian or Pacific Islander alone (NH)	0	0	0.00%	0.00%
Other race alone (NH)	0	0	0.00%	0.00%
Mixed race or Multiracial (NH)	1	9	0.67%	5.39%
Hispanic or Latino (any race)	3	1	2.00%	0.60%
Total	150	167	100.00%	100.00%

== Notable resident ==
Birthplace of Trombonist Grover Mitchell
