= Grove Hill Courthouse Square Historic District =

Historic district in Alabama, United States

- U.S. National Register of Historic Places
- U.S. Historic district
- Alabama Register of Landmarks and Heritage
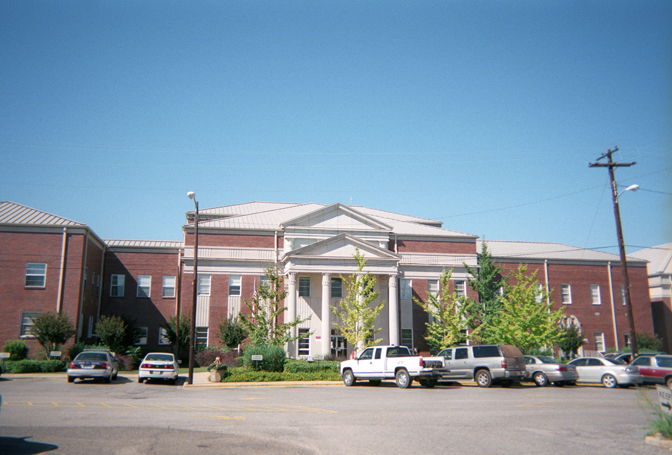
- The Clarke County Courthouse

- Location within Alabama Location within the United States
- Location: Roughly along Cobb, Court, Jackson, and Main Sts., Grove Hill, Alabama
- Coordinates: 31°42′32″N 87°46′39″W
- Architectural style: Greek Revival, Queen Anne
- MPS: Clarke County MPS
- NRHP reference No.: 98000410

Significant dates
- Added to NRHP: April 30, 1998
- Designated ARLH: March 24, 1995

The Grove Hill Courthouse Square Historic District is a historic district in Grove Hill, Alabama, United States. It is centered on the Clarke County Courthouse and the boundaries are roughly Cobb, Court, Jackson, and Main Streets. It features examples of Greek Revival and Queen Anne architecture. The district was added to the Alabama Register of Landmarks and Heritage on March 24, 1995, and to the National Register of Historic Places on April 30, 1998.
