= Alabama State Route 118 =

State highway in Alabama, United States

State Route 118

Route information
- Maintained by ALDOT
- Length: 64 mi (103 km)

Major junctions
- West end: US 278 at the Mississippi state line in Gattman, MS
- US 43 / US 278 / SR 142 / SR 171 in Guin; US 43 / SR 171 / SR 253 in Winfield; I-22 / US 78 east-southeast of Carbon Hill
- East end: SR 69 in Jasper

Location
- Country: United States
- State: Alabama
- Counties: Lamar, Marion, Walker

Highway system
- Alabama State Highway System; Interstate; US; State
← SR 117	→ SR 119

State Route 118 (SR 118) is a 64-mile-long (103 km) state highway in the northwestern part of the U.S. state of Alabama.

== History ==
Prior to the completion of sections of Interstate 22 (I-22), SR 118 served only as the unsigned partner route of U.S. Route 278 (US 278) between the Mississippi state line, west-southwest of Sulligent, and Guin. As new sections of I-22 were opened, US 78 has been rerouted onto the new Interstate highway, and the old sections of US 78 were designated as SR 118, thus extending the highway eastward by nearly 40 miles (64 km). The current eastern terminus of the highway is in the western part of Jasper, at an intersection with SR 69.

== Route description ==
SR 118 begins at the state line betwwen Mississippi and Alabama, but is an independent route only along the former routing of US 78, beginning at its junction with US 43/SR 171 and SR 142 at Guin, leading towards Jasper.

Much of the signed segment of the route is aligned along a two-lane road. The roadway expands to four lanes as it passes through Winfield but returns to two lanes as it leaves that city. At Carbon Hill, the highway briefly expands to four lanes, only to revert to a two-lane road as it heads southeasterly towards Jasper. It has an interchange with I-22/US 78/SR 4 east of Carbon Hill and again west of Jasper before it ends at SR 69.

== Major intersections ==
County	Location	mi	km	Destinations	Notes
Alabama–Mississippi line		0.0	0.0	US 278 west – Gattman	Western terminus; US 278 continues into Mississippi
Lamar		1.3	2.1	CR 21 south (Shake Rag Road)	Northern terminus of CR 21
Lamar	Sulligent	5.7	9.2	SR 17 – Vernon, Hamilton	
Lamar		9.0	14.5	CR 77	
Lamar	Beaverton	12.8	20.6	CR 49	
Marion		17.8	28.6	SR 142 east – Guin	Western terminus of SR 142
Marion	Guin	19.4	31.2	SR 107 south – Fayette	Northern terminus of SR 107
Marion	Guin	19.5	31.4	CR 69 east	Western terminus of CR 69
Marion	Guin	19.7	31.7	SR 142 west (11th Avenue) / US 43 / SR 171 north / US 278 east	Eastern end of US 278 concurrency; western end of US 43/SR 171 concurrency; eastern terminus of SR 142
Marion	Guin	20.1	32.3	SR 44 east – Yampertown	Western terminus of SR 44
Marion	Guin	20.9	33.6	CR 21 north	Southern terminus of CR 21
Marion	Gu-Win	22.7	36.5	CR 27	
Marion	Winfield	24.6	39.6	CR 69 south	Northern terminus of CR 69
Marion	Winfield	26.0	41.8	CR 28 south	Northern terminus of CR 28
Marion	Winfield	26.2	42.2	US 43 south / SR 171 south / SR 253 north – Fayette, Twin	Eastern end of US 43/SR 171 concurrency; southern terminus of SR 253
Marion	Winfield	28.2	45.4	SR 129 north – Haleyville	Western end of SR 129 concurrency
Marion	Winfield	28.9	46.5	CR 31 south (Cambridge Drive)	Northern terminus of SR 31
Marion	Winfield	29.6	47.6	SR 129 south – Glen Allen	Eastern end of SR 129 concurrency
Marion		29.8	48.0	CR 60 north	Southern terminus of CR 60
Marion		32.7	52.6	SR 233 – Glen Allen, Rock City	
Walker	Eldridge	37.8	60.8	SR 13 – Haleyville	
Walker	Carbon Hill	44.2	71.1	CR 11	
Walker		47.8	76.9	SR 124 east – Townley	Western terminus of SR 124
Walker		49.4	79.5	I-22 / US 78 (SR 4) – Tupelo, Birmingham	I-22 exit 52
Walker	Jasper			I-22 / US 78 (SR 4) – Tupelo, Birmingham	I-22 exit 57
Walker	Jasper	57.4	92.4	SR 69 to SR 269 – Jasper Business District	Eastern terminus; road continues north as SR 69
1.000 mi = 1.609 km; 1.000 km = 0.621 mi: Concurrency terminus
