= U.S. Route 78 in Alabama =

U.S. Highway in Alabama, United States

U.S. Route 78
- State Route 4
- US 78 highlighted in red

Route information
- Maintained by ALDOT
- Existed: 1926–present

Major junctions
- West end: I-22 / US 78 at the Mississippi state line in Bexar
- US 43 / US 278 in Hamilton; I-22 in Graysville; I-20 / I-59 in Birmingham; US 11 in Birmingham; I-65 in Birmingham; I-20 in Leeds; US 411 in Leeds; I-20 in Pell City; US 231 in Pell City; US 431 in Oxford
- East end: US 78 at the Georgia state line near Tallapoosa, GA

Location
- Country: United States
- State: Alabama
- Counties: Marion, Walker, Jefferson, Saint Clair, Talladega, Calhoun, Cleburne

Highway system
- United States Numbered Highway System; List; Special; Divided; Alabama State Highway System; Interstate; US; State
← SR 77	→ SR 79
← SR 3	SR 4	→ SR 5

U.S. Route 78 (US 78) is a major east–west U.S. Highway across the central part of Alabama. It is internally designated State Route 4 (SR 4) by the Alabama Department of Transportation (ALDOT), though the only section of SR 4 that is signed is along portions mainly west of Jasper. The section from the Mississippi state line to near Graysville is concurrent with Interstate 22 (I-22); from Graysville south to Birmingham, US 78 takes its original routing. East of Birmingham to the Georgia state line, US 78 has been replaced as a major through-route by I-20. The two routes roughly parallel each other, with junctions at Leeds and Pell City.

West of Jasper, old US 78 is signed as SR 118 to Guin, and the segment from Guin northward to I-22 at Hamilton is signed as US 43/US 278.

== Route description ==
=== From Mississippi state line to Graysville ===
Still a four-lane freeway, I-22/US 78 (internally designated as State Route 4, or SR 4) enters into northwestern Alabama northwest of Bexar in Marion County and heads east-southeastward. Its first interchange (exit 3) is located just east of town at County Route 33 (CR 33). I-22/US 78/SR 4's next four exits (7, 11, 14, and 16) serve the city of Hamilton, the county seat. The freeway curls around the southwest side of the city. Exit 7 gives I-22/US 78/SR 4 access to SR 19 and SR 74, exit 11 is an interchange with SR 17 and exit 16 is an interchange with US 43/US 278/SR 171. The final exit also provides access to the community of Guin. I-22/US 78 then passes south of Brilliant which is accessible by interchanges with SR 44 (exit 26, which also serves the town of Twin and the city of Guin) and SR 129 (exit 30, which also serves the community of Winfield). An interchange with SR 233 (exit 34) serves the community of Glen Allen before I-22/US 78/SR 4 crosses into Walker County. Its next interchange, SR 13 (exit 39), serves the communities of Eldridge and Natural Bridge. Carbon Hill is served by CR 11 (exit 46, which also serves Nauvoo) and SR 118 (exit 52; former US 78 Alternate). I-22/US 78/SR 4 then widens to six lanes and has an unsigned interchange (exit 53) with future SR 102. I-22/US 78/SR 4 then passes just south of Jasper, the county seat, which is served by four exits (57, 61, 63, and 65) with SR 118, SR 69, SR 269, and Industrial Parkway. The freeway narrows to four lanes at exit 57 but expands back to six lanes at exit 63. The next three exits (70, 72, and 78) serve Cordova, Parrish, Dora, Sumiton, Wyatt, and Quinton. I-22/US 78/SR 4 then enters Jefferson County and has an interchange with CR 45 (exit 81), which serves West Jefferson. Its next interchange is with SR 5 (exit 85); the exit marks the end of the concurrency with US 78/SR 4 which branches off and becomes concurrent with SR 5 south, which serves as a local road for Graysville and the northwestern suburbs of Birmingham. Past this interchange, I-22 ends soon at I-65, northwest of Birmingham.

=== From Graysville to Georgia state line ===
US 78 leaves its concurrency with I-22 at exit 85 and joins SR 5 (Bankhead Highway) near Graysville. One mile later, it has an interchange linking Graysville and West Jefferson. It then has an interchange with Hillcrest Road in Adamsville before crossing through Forestdale and Birmingham.

In the neighborhood of North Pratt, US 78/SR 5 has an interchange. The road then curves south after intersecting with SR 378. It then meets I-20/I-59 at the former campus of Birmingham–Southern College. Near Legion Field, US 78 turns east along US 11, while SR 5 turns west along US 11. In the downtown area of Birmingham, US 11/US 78 split into a one-way pair where they meet with I-65. Eastbound US 78 continues east along 3rd Avenue N before turning south onto 13th Street N; westbound traffic continues west along 1st Avenue N before turning north onto 9th Street. US 78 parallels the railroads, including Amtrak's Crescent service; Amtrak trains stop at Birmingham station near 1st Avenue N and 19th Street N. US 78 turns south along 24th Street and then turns east along another one-way pair. Eastbound traffic travels along 4th Avenue S, while westbound traffic travels along 3rd Avenue S. US 31 and US 280 indirectly serve US 78 at a RIRO one block after the split. The split ends at 36th Street S. Starting in Irondale, US 78 begins to have numerous direct or indirect encounters with I-20. In Leeds, it intersects US 411/SR 119 before entering St. Clair County.

US 78 parallels I-20 all the way toward Aiken, South Carolina. US 78 enters I-20 at Cooks Springs and leaves the freeway at the next exit near Pell City. US 78 enters the downtown area of Pell City and intersects with US 231. After leaving Pell City and entering Riverside, US 78 finds itself paralleling the Coosa River. After meeting I-20 again, US 78 crosses over a narrow two-lane truss bridge. After crossing the river, the route enters Lincoln and eventually intersects with SR 77 near downtown. The route also enters Oxford and meets SR 202, SR 21, and US 431; US 78 meets US 431 at a one-quadrant interchange. SR 9 runs concurrently with US 78 before entering downtown Heflin. As US 78 leaves the downtown area, US 78 meets with SR 46. US 78 serves Edwardsville and Fruithurst before entering the state of Georgia.

== History ==
US 78 was formed in 1926 along most of its current route; at the time, it was signed as SR 51, most of SR 8, SR 40, and a part of SR 4. US 78N (former SR 8) and US 78S (former SR 4) were also formed between Heflin, Alabama and Villa Rica, Georgia. With a revised system of state routes in 1928, US 78 and US 78N were coupled with SR 4, while US 78S was coupled with SR 46. In 1934, in an effort to abandon almost all suffixed U.S. Routes, US 78S was renumbered to US 78 Alt., while US 78N became part of US 78.

The routing of US 78 in the Birmingham area has changed several times over the years. Prior to 1941, US 78 traveled along 16th Avenue Thomas before turning south along present-day US 78. The route then traveled east along 12th Avenue W, Bankhead Highway, then south along 3rd Street N, and then east along 8th Avenue N. The routing changed in 1941 to travel further along 8th Street W near Birmingham-Southern College and then turn east along 8th Avenue W, passing on the north side of historic Legion Field. Before the early 1950s, US 78 east followed a two-lane road through the heart of Graysville (Main Street) and then shared the current four-lane road until Adamsville when it became Main Street once again and then became Forestdale Boulevard near the present interchange of US 78 and Minor Parkway. The original route crossed US 78 and became Pratt Highway, which goes into the old steel mill community of Pratt City and then into Birmingham. Construction of a 4-lane routing led to a realignment of US 78. Also, US 78 was rerouted onto 3rd Avenue S east of downtown Birmingham.

In 1953, US 78 was rerouted south to bypass Anniston; part of the old alignment became SR 202. In 1957, SR 4 was rerouted north between Hamilton and Jasper to serve Natural Bridge and other towns along SR 5 and the newly extended US 278. By 1972, US 78 was rerouted to enter/exit I-20 at Cooks Springs instead of Moody.

== Major intersections ==
County	Location	mi	km	Exit	Destinations	Notes
Marion		0.00	0.00		I-22 west / US 78 west (Elvis Aaron Presley Memorial Highway) – Tupelo	Continuation into Mississippi
Marion		3.93	6.32	3	CR 33 – Bexar	
Marion	Hamilton	7.80	12.55	7	CR 94 to SR 74 – Weston, Hamilton	Provides access to US 278 east and to SR 19 Red Bay
Marion	Hamilton	11.45	18.43	11	SR 17 – Hamilton, Sulligent, York, Butler, Mobile	Also connects to SR 19
Marion	Hamilton	14.46	23.27	14	CR 35 – Hamilton	
Marion	Hamilton	16.91	27.21	16	US 43 / US 278 / SR 171 – Hamilton, Guin	
Marion		22.52	36.24	22	CR 45	
Marion		26.24	42.23	26	SR 44 – Brilliant, Guin	Also serves the community of Twin
Marion	Winfield	29.92	48.15	30	SR 129 – Brilliant, Winfield	
Marion		34.38	55.33	34	SR 233 – Glen Allen, Natural Bridge	
Walker		39.62	63.76	39	SR 13 – Natural Bridge, Eldridge	Also access to Fayette and Tuscaloosa via SR 13 south
Walker	Carbon Hill	46.87	75.43	46	CR 11 – Carbon Hill, Nauvoo	
Walker		51.83	83.41	52	SR 118 – Carbon Hill	
Walker		53.47	86.05	53	Unnamed Road	No signage except exit gore signs; Future SR 102
Walker	Jasper	57.40	92.38	57	SR 118 east – Jasper	
Walker	Jasper	60.54	97.43	61	SR 69 – Jasper, Tuscaloosa	
Walker	Jasper	62.75	100.99	63	SR 269 – Jasper, Parrish	
Walker	Jasper	65.26	105.03	65	Industrial Parkway – Jasper	
Walker		70.03	112.70	70	CR 22 – Cordova, Parrish	
Walker		71.99	115.86	72	CR 61 – Cordova	
Walker		78.36	126.11	78	CR 81 – Dora, Sumiton	
Jefferson	West Jefferson	80.75	129.95	81	CR 45 – West Jefferson	
Jefferson	Graysville	85.24	137.18	85	I-22 east (SR 4 east) / SR 5 north – Birmingham, Adamsville	Eastern end of I-22 overlap; western end of SR 5 overlap
Jefferson	Graysville				I-422 to I-22	Future interchange; exit 12 on I-422
Jefferson	Adamsville	89.27	143.67		CR 65 to Hillcrest Road	
Jefferson	Birmingham	93.45	150.39		Daniel Payne Drive	
Jefferson	Birmingham	95.58	153.82		SR 378 east (Finley Boulevard) to I-65	Western terminus of SR 378
Jefferson	Birmingham	96.14	154.72		I-20 / I-59 to I-65	Exit 123 on I-20/I-59
Jefferson	Birmingham	97.25	156.51		US 11 south / SR 5 south (SR 7 / 3rd Avenue West)	Eastern end of SR 5 overlap; western end of US 11 overlap
Jefferson	Birmingham	98.86	159.10		Southwestern end of one-way segment	
Jefferson	Birmingham	98.98	159.29		I-65 south / 10th Street North / 11th Street North – Montgomery	Access only from US 11 north to I-65 south and from I-65 north to US 11 north; exit 260B on I-65
Jefferson	Birmingham	99.34	159.87		Northeastern end of one-way segment	
Jefferson	Birmingham	100.35	161.50		US 11 north (1st Avenue North)	Eastern end of US 11 overlap
Jefferson	Birmingham	100.58– 100.78	161.87– 162.19		25th Street South / 27th Street South to US 31 / US 280	
Jefferson	Birmingham	106.65	171.64		To I-20 – Birmingham, Atlanta	
Jefferson	Leeds	113.37	182.45		I-20 – Birmingham, Atlanta	Exit 140 on I-20
Jefferson	Leeds	116.20	187.01		SR 119 south	
Jefferson	Leeds	116.64	187.71		US 411 north / SR 25 north (9th Street)	Western end of SR 25 overlap; southern terminus of US 411
Jefferson	Leeds	117.04	188.36		SR 25 south – Vincent	Eastern end of SR 25 overlap
St. Clair		128.67	207.07		I-20 west – Birmingham	Western end of I-20 overlap; exit 153 on I-20
St. Clair	Pell City	131.50	211.63		I-20 east – Atlanta	Eastern end of I-20 overlap; exit 156 on I-20
St. Clair	Pell City	134.77	216.89		To US 231	
St. Clair	Riverside	138.94	223.60		I-20 – Birmingham, Atlanta	Exit 162 on I-20
Talladega	Lincoln	145.10	233.52		SR 77 to I-20	
Calhoun	Oxford	155.96	250.99		SR 202 to I-20	
Calhoun	Oxford	161.86	260.49		SR 21 to I-20 – Anniston, Talladega	Access to Talladega Municipal Airport
Calhoun	Oxford	164.35	264.50		To US 431 / I-20 – Anniston	
Calhoun		168.15	270.61		SR 301 to I-20 / US 431	Northern terminus of SR 301
Calhoun		172.22	277.16		SR 9 north – White Plains, Piedmont	Western end of SR 9 overlap
Cleburne		173.88	279.83		SR 281 south (Talladega Scenic Drive) – Cheaha State Park	Northern terminus of SR 281
Cleburne	Heflin	176.49	284.03		SR 9 south to I-20 – Lineville, Montgomery	Eastern end of SR 9 overlap
Cleburne	Heflin	177.72	286.01		SR 46 east to I-20 – Ranburne	Western terminus of SR 46
Cleburne		193.67	311.68		US 78 east / SR 8 east – Tallapoosa	Continuation into Georgia
1.000 mi = 1.609 km; 1.000 km = 0.621 mi: Concurrency terminus; Unopened

== See also ==
- Interstate 22

U.S. Route 78
Previous state: Mississippi	Alabama	Next state: Georgia
