= Alabama State Route 171 =

State highway in Alabama, United States

State Route 171

Route information
- Maintained by ALDOT
- Length: 73.355 mi (118.053 km)

Major junctions
- South end: US 43 in Northport
- SR 118 / SR 253 in Winfield; US 278 / SR 142 in Guin; I-22 / US 78 south of Hamilton
- North end: US 43 / US 278 / SR 17 in Hamilton

Location
- Country: United States
- State: Alabama
- Counties: Fayette, Marion, Tuscaloosa

Highway system
- Alabama State Highway System; Interstate; US; State
← SR 170	→ SR 172

State Route 171 (SR 171) is an American 73.355-mile (118.053 km) state highway that serves as a north-south connection between Northport and Hamilton through Fayette, Marion and Tuscaloosa Counties. SR 171 intersects US 43 at its southern terminus and US 43/US 278/SR 17 at its northern terminus.

== Route description ==
SR 171 begins at its intersection with US 43 in Northport. From this point, SR 171 travels in a northerly direction through rural portions of northern Tuscaloosa County en route to Fayette. In Fayette, SR 171 intersects SR 159 and US 43 near its central business district and both SR 129 and SR 102 on its north side. The route continues in its northerly track and intersects US 78 and I-22 en route to its northern terminus at SR 17 in Hamilton. Additionally, between Fayette and its northern terminus SR 171 has a 37.869-mile (60.944 km) concurrency with US 43. This route serves as an effective bypass of Berry and Stough for travelers on US 43, maintaining a north-to-south route while US 43 heads east-to-west to SR 18 East and SR 13 North near Berry, where US 43 returns to its main configuration towards Tuscaloosa.

== Major intersections ==
County	Location	mi	km	Destinations	Notes
Tuscaloosa	Northport	0.0	0.0	US 43 (SR 13) – Tuscaloosa, Berry	Southern terminus
Fayette	Fayette	34.364	55.303	SR 159 south – Gordo	Northern terminus of SR 159
Fayette	Fayette	35.486	57.109	US 43 south (Columbus Street) / SR 18 – Berry, Vernon	Southern end of US 43 concurrency
Fayette	Fayette	40.403	65.022	SR 129 north – Glen Allen	Southern terminus of SR 129
Fayette	Fayette	41.380	66.595	SR 102 east – Townley	Western terminus of SR 102
Marion	Winfield	53.696	86.415	SR 118 east (Bankhead Avenue) / SR 253 north – Carbon Hill, Yampertown	Southern end of SR 118 concurrency; southern terminus of SR 253
Marion	Guin	59.871	96.353	SR 44 east (7th Street) – Yampertown, Brilliant	Western terminus of SR 44
Marion	Guin	60.236	96.940	US 278 west (SR 118 west/SR 107 south) – Beaverton, Sulligent SR 142 west (11th Avenue W)	Northern end of SR 118 concurrency; southern end of US 278 concurrency; eastern terminus of SR 142; northern terminus of SR 107
Marion	Hamilton	68.598	110.398	I-22 / US 78 (SR 4) – Tupelo, Birmingham	I-22/US 78 exit 16
Marion	Hamilton	73.355	118.053	US 43 north / US 278 east (Military Street) / SR 17 (State Highway 17) – Sulligent, Hackleburg, Natural Bridge	Northern terminus of SR 171; US 43/US 278 continues north along SR 17
1.000 mi = 1.609 km; 1.000 km = 0.621 mi: Concurrency terminus
