= Alabama State Route 253 =

State highway in Alabama, United States

State Route 253

Route information
- Maintained by ALDOT
- Length: 31.607 mi (50.867 km)

Major junctions
- South end: US 43 / SR 118 / SR 171 in Winfield
- SR 44 in Twin; US 278 north of Twin
- North end: SR 172 in Hackleburg

Location
- Country: United States
- State: Alabama
- Counties: Marion

Highway system
- Alabama State Highway System; Interstate; US; State
← SR 251	→ SR 255

State Route 253 (SR 253) is a 31-mile-long (50 km) route that serves as a connection between US 43/SR 118/SR 171 in Winfield with SR 172 in Hackleburg.

== Route description ==
The northern terminus of SR 253 is located at its intersection with SR 172 in downtown Hackleburg. From this point, the route travels in a southerly direction before turning to the east towards Brinn. From Brinn, the route resumes in a southwesterly direction before turning to the south in Twin. It continues winding in this direction until reaching its southern terminus at US 43/SR 118/SR 171 in Winfield.

== Major intersections ==
The entire route is in Marion County.

Location	mi	km	Destinations	Notes
Winfield	0.000	0.000	US 43 north / SR 118 / SR 171 north (Bankhead Highway) – Guin, Jasper US 43 south / SR 171 south – Fayette	Southern terminus
Twin	5.991	9.642	SR 44 west – Guin	South end of SR 44 overlap
Twin	6.437	10.359	SR 44 east to I-22 / US 78 – Brilliant	North end of SR 44 overlap
	17.546	28.238	US 278 (SR 74) – Hamilton, Double Springs	
Hackleburg	31.607	50.867	SR 172 (Cedar Tree Street) to US 43 – Hodges, Bear Creek	Northern terminus
1.000 mi = 1.609 km; 1.000 km = 0.621 mi: Concurrency terminus
