= Alabama State Route 129 =

State highway in Alabama, United States

State Route 129

Route information
- Maintained by ALDOT
- Length: 41.2 mi (66.3 km)

Major junctions
- South end: US 43 / SR 171 north of Fayette
- I-22 near Winfield
- North end: SR 13 in Haleyville

Location
- Country: United States
- State: Alabama

Highway system
- Alabama State Highway System; Interstate; US; State
| ← SR 128 | → SR 130 |

State Route 129 (SR 129) is a 41.2-mile-long (66.3 km) state highway in Fayette and Marion counties in the northwestern part of the U.S. state of Alabama. The southern terminus of the highway is at U.S. Route 43 (US 43) and SR 171 north of Fayette. The northern terminus of the highway is at an intersection with SR 13 in Haleyville.

== Route description ==
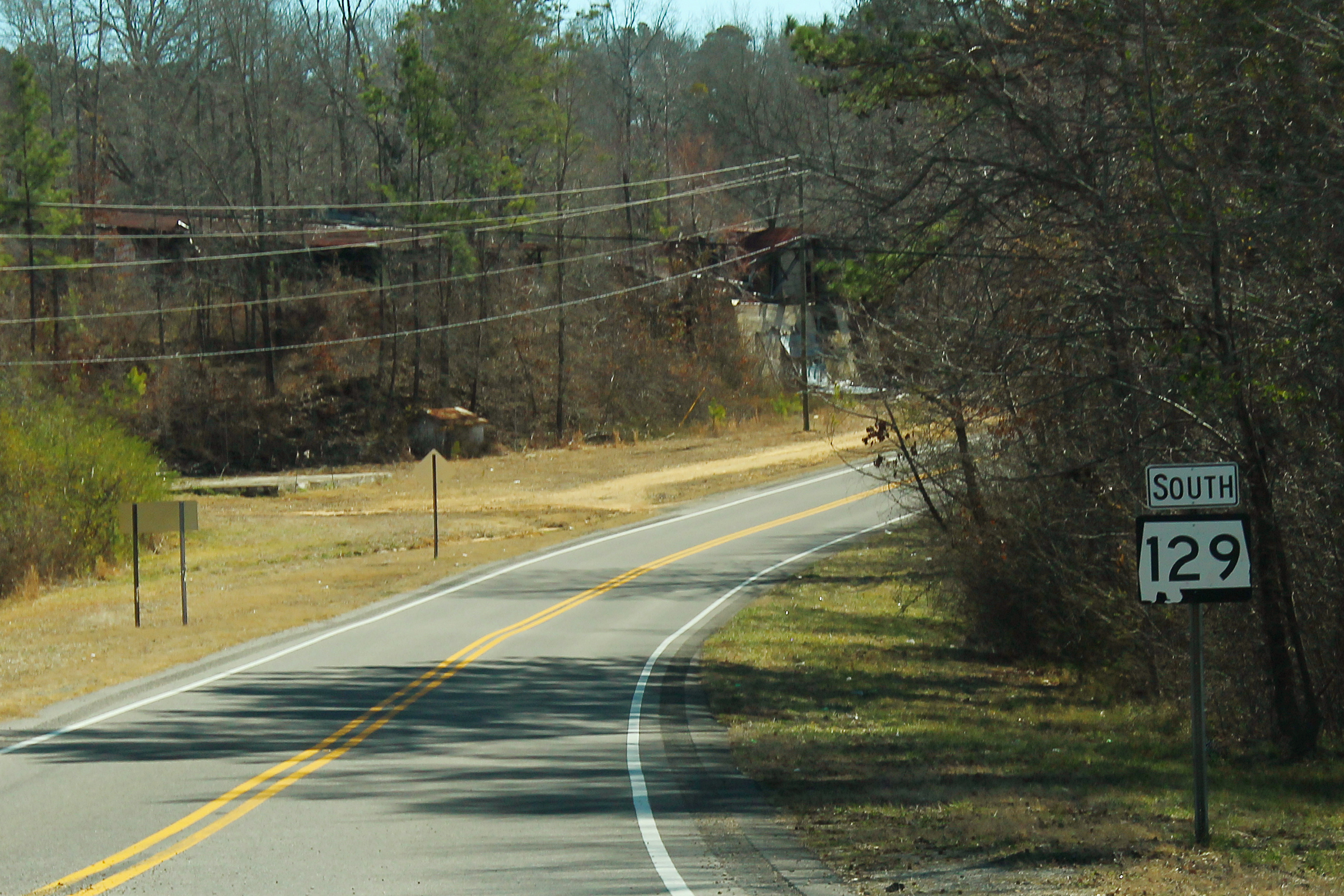
SR 129 south of SR 118 in Marion County

SR 129 begins at an intersection with US 43/SR 171 north of Fayette. After only 1.3 miles (2.1 km), SR 129 intersects SR 102. While going through the town of Glen Allen, SR 129 intersects the southern terminus of SR 233. Then, SR 129 enters Marion County. Before reaching Winfield, SR 129 has a concurrency with SR 118 for 1.4 miles (2.3 km). While heading north toward Brilliant, SR 129 has an interchange with Interstate 22 (I-22)/US 78/SR 4 then heads north to Brilliant through wooded areas. Before reaching its northern terminus, SR 129 intersects US 278 (internally designated as SR 74) and SR 241. SR 129 reaches its northern terminus, at an intersection with SR 13 in Haleyville.

== Major intersections ==
| County | Location | mi | km | Destinations | Notes |
|---|---|---|---|---|---|
| Fayette | Fayette | 0.0 | 0.0 | US 43 / SR 171 – Fayette, Winfield | Southern terminus |
| Fayette | | 1.3 | 2.1 | SR 102 – Townley | |
| Marion | Glen Allen | 13.8 | 22.2 | SR 233 north | Southern terminus of SR 233 |
| Marion | Winfield | 15.3 | 24.6 | SR 118 east – Eldridge, Carbon Hill, Jasper | Southern end of SR 118 concurrency |
| Marion | Winfield | 16.7 | 26.9 | SR 118 west – Downtown, Guin | Northern end of SR 118 concurrency |
| Marion | Winfield | 20.9 | 33.6 | I-22 / US 78 / SR 4 – Tupelo, Birmingham | I-22/US 78/SR 4 exit 30 |
| Marion | Brilliant | 22.9 | 36.9 | SR 44 west – Twin | Eastern terminus of SR 44 |
| Marion | | 31.4 | 50.5 | US 278 (SR 74) – Hamilton, Double Springs | |
| Marion | Haleyville | 41.2 | 66.3 | SR 13 – Jasper, Russellville | Northern terminus |
1.000 mi = 1.609 km; 1.000 km = 0.621 mi: Concurrency terminus
