= Interstate 22 =

Interstate Highway in Mississippi and Alabama

Interstate 22
- Corridor X
- I-22 highlighted in red

Route information
- Maintained by MDOT and ALDOT
- Length: 202.22 mi (325.44 km)
- Existed: 2012–present
- NHS: Entire route

Major junctions
- West end: I-269 / US 78 / MS 304 near Byhalia, MS
- US 45 in Tupelo, MS; US 43 / US 278 / SR 171 in Hamilton, AL; US 78 / SR 5 in Graysville, AL
- East end: I-65 near Birmingham, AL

Location
- Country: United States
- States: Mississippi, Alabama
- Counties: MS: DeSoto, Marshall, Benton, Union, Pontotoc, Lee, Itawamba; AL: Marion, Walker, Jefferson

Highway system
- Interstate Highway System; Main; Auxiliary; Suffixed; Business; Future
- Mississippi State Highway System; Interstate; US; State
- Alabama State Highway System; Interstate; US; State
← MS 21	MS	→ MS 22
← SR 21	AL	→ SR 22

Interstate 22 (I-22) is a 202.22-mile-long (325.44 km) Interstate Highway in the US states of Mississippi and Alabama, connecting I-269 near Byhalia, Mississippi, to I-65 near Birmingham, Alabama. I-22 is also Corridor X of the Appalachian Development Highway System (ADHS). Designated in 2012, I-22 follows the route of older U.S. Route 78 (US 78) and is concurrent with the route for all but its easternmost 11 miles (18 km). The freeway mainly spans rural areas and passes numerous small towns along its route, including Fulton, Tupelo, New Albany, and Holly Springs in Mississippi and Jasper, Winfield, and Hamilton in Alabama.

I-22 was upgraded to Interstate Highway standards to close a gap in the Interstate Highway System, allowing for more direct connections between cities in the southeast with cities in the central part of the country. I-22 indirectly connects I-240, I-40, I-55, and I-69 in the Memphis metropolitan area via US 78 and I-269, and indirectly connects with I-459, I-20, and I-59 in the Birmingham metropolitan area via I-65.

== Route description ==
Lengths
	mi	km
MS	106.00	170.59
AL	96.22	154.85
Total	202.22	325.44

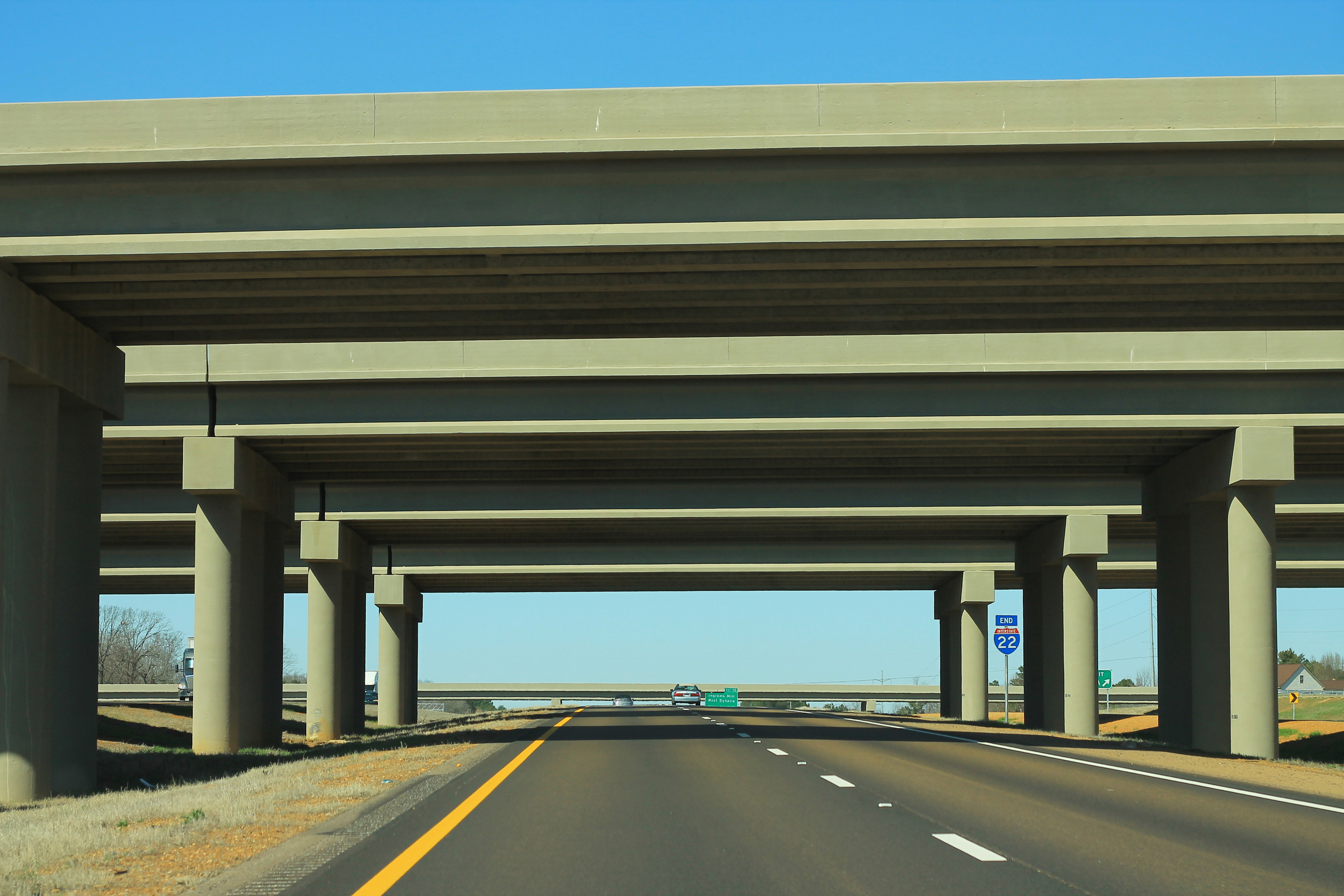
Western terminus of I-22 at I-269 in Byhalia, Mississippi

I-22 serves as a connection between Birmingham and suburban Memphis, filling in a gap in the Interstate Highway System. It also fills a gap that provides freeway passage between Atlanta and Oklahoma City. It begins at an interchange with I-269 at Byhalia, Mississippi, approximately 25 miles (40 km) from downtown Memphis and travels southeast across northern Mississippi and Alabama, before ending at an interchange with I-65 approximately five miles (8.0 km) north of downtown Birmingham, Alabama.

=== Mississippi ===
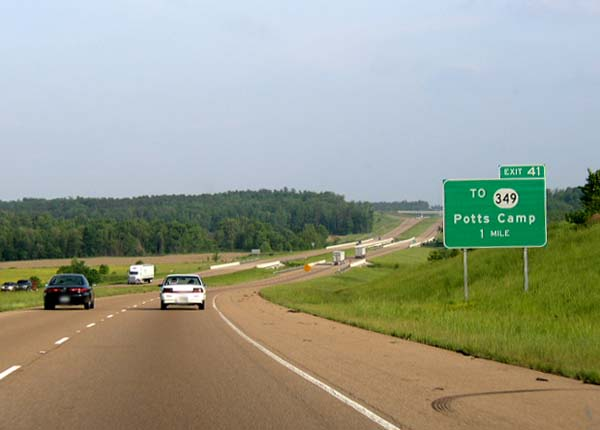
Eastbound I-22/US 78 in Potts Camp, Mississippi

I-22 begins at a cloverleaf interchange with I-269 just west of Byhalia in DeSoto County in northwestern Mississippi in the far southeastern suburbs of Memphis. It is concurrent with US 78, which is a four-lane freeway through its entire length in Mississippi and the exit numbers for its overlap with I-22 remain based on its mileage. I-22/US 78 then continues southeastward into Marshall County parallel to Mississippi Highway 178 (MS 178; the former alignment of US 78) with latter route providing local access to small towns along the route. The first major community the freeway passes is Holly Springs, the county seat of Marshall County. I-22/US 78 bypasses the city to the southwest; exits 26 (Landfill Road) and 30 (MS 4/MS 7) provide access to the city. Continuing southeastward, the freeway than passes through the Holly Springs National Forest and into Benton County passing near several small towns that are accessible through interchanges with or connecting to MS 178. Upon exiting the forest into Union County, I-22/US 78 approaches the county seat of New Albany before passing just southwest of it with four exits (60, 61, 63, and 64) providing direct access to the city. MS 30 shares a brief concurrency with I-22/US 78 between exits 61 and 64 with the latter exit being at MS 15. To the southeast of the city near the town of Sherman in Pontotoc County, I-22/US 78 has a second brief concurrency with MS 9 starting between the exits 73 and 76. Exit 73 is a six-ramp partial cloverleaf interchange, the first non-diamond interchange on the freeway since its starting point at I-269, a distance of about 61.2 miles (98.5 km). I-22/US 78 then enters Lee County and passes north of Tupelo, its county seat, with five exits (81, 82, 85, 86, and 87) connecting to the city, including an interchange with MS 178 (exit 81) northwest of Tupelo along with interchanges with the Natchez Trace Parkway (exit 85) and US 45/Corridor V (exit 86) north of the city with Corridor V becoming concurrent with I-22/US 78. The freeway then turns eastward and has an interchange with MS 371 north of Mooreville before crossing into Itawamba County. I-22/US 78/Corridor V then has an interchange with MS 178 (to MS 363) in Peppertown before crossing the Tennessee–Tombigbee Waterway to its next interchange with South Adams Street (exit 104), which provides access to the community of Fulton, the county seat. MS 25 becomes concurrent with I-22/US 78/Corridor V and heads eastward along the route at the exit as well. A weigh station is also just beyond the exit. One exit later (108), MS 25 and Corridor V branch off and head northward. I-22/US 78 then turns east-southeastward with one final interchange (exit 113) with MS 23 south of Tremont before crossing into Alabama.

=== Alabama ===
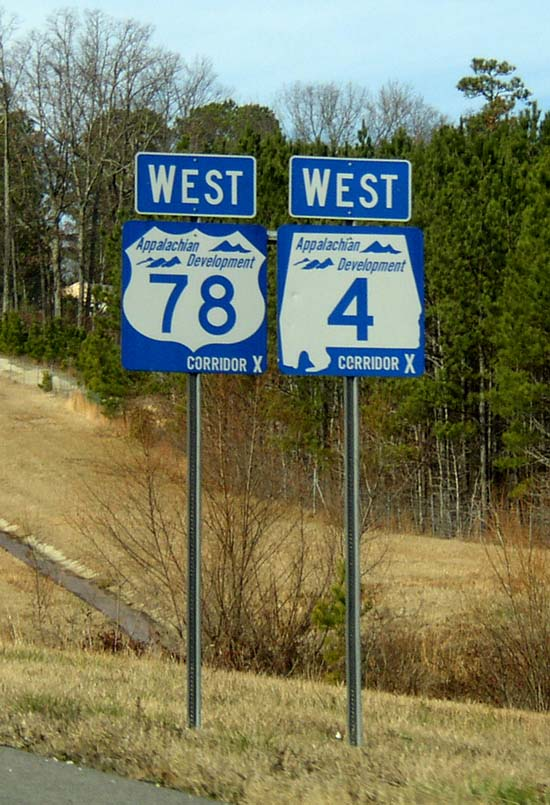
Corridor X ADHS shields in Marion County, Alabama, prior to its redesignation as I-22

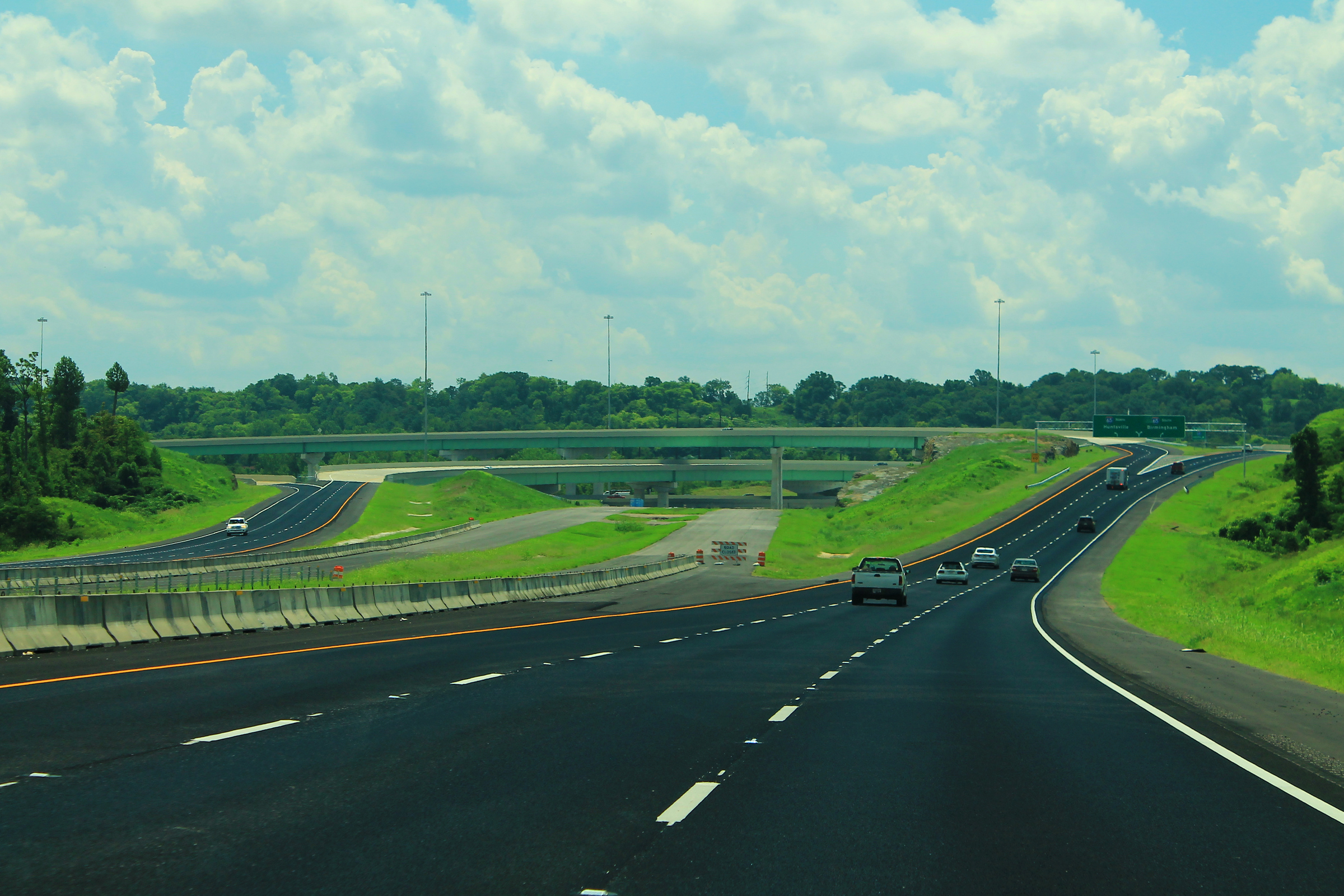
Eastern terminus at I-65 in Birmingham, Alabama, as of 2016. The freeway is planned to be extended east toward US 31.

Still a four-lane freeway, I-22/US 78 (internally designated as State Route 4, or SR 4) enters into northwestern Alabama northwest of Bexar in Marion County and heads east-southeastward. Its first interchange (exit 3) is located just east of town at County Route 33 (CR 33). I-22/US 78/SR 4's next four exits (7, 11, 14, and 16) serve the city of Hamilton, the county seat. The freeway curls around the southwest side of the city. Exit 7 gives I-22/US 78/SR 4 access to SR 19 and SR 74, exit 11 is an interchange with SR 17 and exit 16 is an interchange with US 43/US 278/SR 171. The final exit also provides access to the community of Guin. I-22/US 78 then passes south of Brilliant which is accessible by interchanges with SR 44 (exit 26, which also serves the town of Twin and the city of Guin) and SR 129 (exit 30, which also serves the community of Winfield). An interchange with SR 233 (exit 34) serves the community of Glen Allen before I-22/US 78/SR 4 crosses into Walker County. Its next interchange, SR 13 (exit 39), serves the communities of Eldridge and Natural Bridge. Carbon Hill is served by CR 11 (exit 46, which also serves Nauvoo) and SR 118 (exit 52; former US 78 Alternate). I-22/US 78/SR 4 then widens to six lanes and has an unsigned interchange (exit 53) with future SR 102. I-22/US 78/SR 4 then passes just south of Jasper, the county seat, which is served by four exits (57, 61, 63, and 65) with SR 118, SR 69, SR 269, and Industrial Parkway. The freeway narrows to four lanes at exit 57 but expands back to six lanes at exit 63. The next three exits (70, 72, and 78) serve Cordova, Parrish, Dora, Sumiton, Wyatt, and Quinton. I-22/US 78/SR 4 then enters Jefferson County and has an interchange with CR 45 (exit 81), which serves West Jefferson. Its next interchange is with SR 5 (exit 85); the exit marks the end of the concurrency with US 78/SR 4 which branches off and becomes concurrent with SR 5 south, which serves as a local road for Graysville and the northwestern suburbs of Birmingham. Between exits 85 and 87 (CR 112) is the future site of the interchange with I-222 (exit 86), which would connect I-22 to the proposed I-422 (Corridor X-1/Birmingham Northern Beltline). I-22 than passes through Coalburg before ending at an interchange with I-65 (unsigned exits 95A and 95B) approximately five miles (8.0 km) north of downtown Birmingham. Ramp stubs for an additional interchange (future exit 95C) just beyond I-65 to US 31 have been made, but construction on this won't begin until at least 2030.

== History ==
The concept of a Memphis-to-Birmingham expressway was discussed as early as the 1950s but did not move beyond talk for more than 20 years. Political push for Corridor X began in the 1970s under the leadership of Congressman Tom Bevill. After Bevill's retirement, Congressman Robert Aderholt was involved with completing the project.

When studies for I-22 began, the highway was proposed to continue west to downtown Memphis, Tennessee, and end at I-240 and I-69. Several other proposals were also considered. One took I-22 along I-269 to I-55/I-69 and another took it along Crump Boulevard to end at I-55, but those plans never materialized.

The part of I-22 just east of Fulton, Mississippi, was approved by Congress as "Corridor X" in 1978, as a part of the ADHS, and parts of I-22 have been under construction ever since. Corridor X was also designated as "High Priority Corridor 10" in the federal National Highway System Designation Act of 1995 and as "High Priority Corridor 45" in later legislation. Over the many years of development, the project changed multiple times.

In 2004, Corridor X was designated as Future I-22 by Public Law Number 108-199, and the designation was made official on April 18, 2005. In Alabama and Mississippi, blue signs reading "FUTURE/I-22/CORRIDOR" at left and an I-22 shield with "FUTURE" instead of "INTERSTATE" at the right were unveiled on April 18, 2005.

The first major completed section of the route between the Mississippi state line and Jasper was opened to traffic on November 22, 2005. Exits on the Jasper Bypass portion of I-22 were originally numbered using a kilometer-based sequence because, at the time this stretch was opened, it appeared that all highways in the US were going to be measured using the metric system. The final decision was made to remain using miles, and they have been renumbered according to the highway's mileposts. A six-mile (9.7 km) segment between Graysville and Brookside was opened in June 2007, and another 20-mile (32 km) section of Future I-22 between Jasper and Graysville was opened in November 2007. A 1.8-mile (2.9 km) segment between Cherry Avenue in Forestdale to a point about 2.5 miles (4.0 km) short of I-65 near Fultondale, including an interchange with Coalburg Road, was opened in December 2009. Next came the connection of I-22 with I-65 and US 31. The Alabama Department of Transportation (ALDOT) widened Coalburg Road from its interchange with I-22 southward to Daniel Payne Drive (which leads to I-65) to allow heavy trucks to use it; this project was nearly complete as of May 2015. Signs are now in place on Daniel Payne Drive (westbound) informing truckers that access to I-22 is not allowed from Daniel Payne Drive.

ALDOT was to award contracts in August 2009 for the construction of the final segment of I-22, including its large interchange with I-65 and US 31, with the construction to begin shortly afterward. Funding delays postponed these into 2010, however. On March 19, 2010, President Barack Obama signed the Hiring Incentives to Restore Employment Act (HIRE Act) into law, which included an extension of federal highway funding through the end of 2010. This extension gave the ALDOT the opportunity to proceed with its plans for the construction of final segment of I-22 in Alabama. The opening of the bids for this project began on May 21, 2010. ALDOT announced on June 16, 2010, that the project has been awarded to the company Archer Western Contractors for $168.6 million (equivalent to $236 million in 2024). The project is the most expensive highway project ever undertaken in Jefferson County, and it was the highest-priced contract awarded by the ALDOT as of 2010.

On November 12, 2012, ALDOT's application for establishing I-22 was conditionally approved by the American Association of State Highway and Transportation Officials (AASHTO) at a special committee, pending for the Mississippi Department of Transportation (MDOT) to submit their own application for I-22 and Federal Highway Administration (FHWA) approval. This therefore officially established the existence of I-22.

In April 2013, the first actual I-22 shields were deployed in Marion County, Alabama, immediately east of the Mississippi state line. Such signs will extend east at least through Walker County into the outskirts of Birmingham. On August 21, 2014, ALDOT reported that I-22's interchange with I-65 would not be completed until October 2015. New lanes north and southbound were opened on I-65 passing through the interchange and construction and painting operations were carried out on the I-22 entrance and exit ramps. The interchange to I-65 opened to traffic on June 20, 2016.

Mississippi officials announced May 5, 2015, that the state officially began the process to designate its portion as I-22. The two requirements to be able to apply for this designation were to upgrade the route to Interstate standards and to connect to an existing Interstate within 25 years; this was completed when I-269 was opened in December 2017. The I-65 interchange was opened in October 2015. The route was officially signed in Mississippi in a ceremony on October 23, 2015.

== Exit list ==
Mississippi exit numbers are based on US 78 mileage.

State	County	Location	mi	km	Exit	Destinations	Notes
Mississippi	DeSoto–Marshall county line	Byhalia	0.0	0.0	12	I-269 / MS 304 – Tunica, Collierville US 78 west – Memphis	Western terminus of I-22; western end of US 78 overlap; freeway continues as US 78 westbound; exit 16 on I-269/MS 304
Mississippi	Marshall	Byhalia	2.4	3.9	14	MS 309 – Byhalia	
Mississippi	Marshall		6.6	10.6	18	Victoria Road – Victoria, East Byhalia	
Mississippi	Marshall		9.8	15.8	21	Red Banks Road – Red Banks	
Mississippi	Marshall	Holly Springs	14.4	23.2	26	Landfill Road – West Holly Springs, Ashland	Former MS 4/MS 7
Mississippi	Marshall	Holly Springs	18.5	29.8	30	MS 4 / MS 7 – Holly Springs, Oxford	Access to Senatobia via MS 7
Mississippi	Marshall		25.5	41.0	37	CCC Road – Lake Center	
Mississippi	Marshall	Potts Camp	29.6	47.6	41	To MS 349 – Potts Camp	
Mississippi	Benton	Hickory Flat	36.4	58.6	48	MS 178 – Hickory Flat	Access to MS 2 and MS 5
Mississippi	Union	Myrtle	42.9	69.0	55	Willow Drive – Myrtle	
Mississippi	Union	New Albany	48.6	78.2	60	Musford Drive – Glenfield	Connector to MS 30 and to a Walmart distribution center
Mississippi	Union	New Albany	49.6	79.8	61	MS 30 west – West New Albany, Mississippi, Oxford	Western end of MS 30 overlap
Mississippi	Union	New Albany	51.0	82.1	63	Bratton Road / Carter Avenue / Central Avenue – Downtown New Albany	
Mississippi	Union	New Albany	52.0	83.7	64	MS 15 / MS 30 east – Pontotoc, Ripley	Eastern end of MS 30 overlap
Mississippi	Union	New Albany	61.2	98.5	73	MS 9 north – Blue Springs	Western end of MS 9 overlap; signed as exits 73A and 73B
Mississippi	Pontotoc	Sherman	64.8	104.3	76	MS 9 south (MS 178) – Sherman, Pontotoc	Eastern end of MS 9 overlap
Mississippi	Lee	Tupelo	69.0	111.0	81	MS 178 (McCullough Boulevard) – West Tupelo	
Mississippi	Lee	Tupelo	70.3	113.1	82	Coley Road / Barnes Crossing Road	
Mississippi	Lee	Tupelo	72.9	117.3	85	Natchez Trace Parkway	
Mississippi	Lee	Tupelo	74.3	119.6	86	US 45 (Corridor V west) – Tupelo, Corinth, Starkville, Meridian, Mobile	Western end of Corridor V overlap; signed as exits 86A (south) and 86B (north)
Mississippi	Lee	Tupelo	75.8	122.0	87	Veterans Boulevard	Access to Elvis Presley birthplace
Mississippi	Lee		78.1	125.7	90	Auburn Road	
Mississippi	Lee		82.2	132.3	94	MS 371 – Mantachie, Mooreville	
Mississippi	Itawamba		85.3	137.3	97	Fawn Grove Road – Dorsey	
Mississippi	Itawamba		88.8	142.9	101	MS 178 / MS 363 – Peppertown, Mantachie	
Mississippi	Itawamba	Fulton	92.9	149.5	104	MS 25 south – Fulton, Amory	Western end of MS 25 overlap, MS 178 resumes eastbound in downtown Fulton
Mississippi	Itawamba		96.6	155.5	108	MS 25 north (Corridor V east) – Belmont, Iuka; Corridor X ends	Eastern end of MS 25/Corridor V overlap; western end of Corridor X overlap; Access to MS 76
Mississippi	Itawamba	Tremont	101.4	163.2	113	MS 23 – Tremont, Smithville	MS 178 terminates eastbound at intersection with MS 23 just north of Corridor X
			106.0 0.00	170.6 0.00	Mississippi–Alabama state line		
Alabama	Marion		3.93	6.32	3	CR 33 / SR 4 – Bexar	Western end of SR 4 overlap
Alabama	Marion	Hamilton	7.80	12.55	7	SR 74 to US 278 – Weston, Hamilton	Provides access to SR 19, CR 94, and Red Bay
Alabama	Marion	Hamilton	11.45	18.43	11	SR 17 – Hamilton, Sulligent, York, Butler, Mobile	Also connects to SR 19
Alabama	Marion	Hamilton	14.46	23.27	14	CR 35 – Hamilton	
Alabama	Marion	Hamilton	16.91	27.21	16	US 43 / US 278 / SR 171 – Hamilton, Guin	
Alabama	Marion		22.52	36.24	22	CR 45	
Alabama	Marion		26.24	42.23	26	SR 44 – Brilliant, Guin	Also serves the community of Twin
Alabama	Marion	Winfield	29.92	48.15	30	SR 129 – Brilliant, Winfield	
Alabama	Marion		34.38	55.33	34	SR 233 – Glen Allen, Natural Bridge	
Alabama	Walker		39.62	63.76	39	SR 13 – Haleyville, Tuscaloosa	
Alabama	Walker	Carbon Hill	46.87	75.43	46	CR 11 – Carbon Hill, Nauvoo	
Alabama	Walker		51.83	83.41	52	SR 118 – Carbon Hill	
Alabama	Walker		53.47	86.05	53	Unnamed road	No signage except exit gore signs; Future SR 102
Alabama	Walker	Jasper	57.40	92.38	57	SR 118 east – Jasper	
Alabama	Walker	Jasper	60.54	97.43	61	SR 69 – Jasper, Tuscaloosa	
Alabama	Walker	Jasper	62.75	100.99	63	SR 269 – Jasper, Parrish	
Alabama	Walker	Jasper	65.26	105.03	65	Industrial Parkway – Jasper	
Alabama	Walker		70.03	112.70	70	CR 22 – Cordova, Parrish	
Alabama	Walker		71.99	115.86	72	CR 61 – Cordova	
Alabama	Walker		78.36	126.11	78	CR 81 – Dora, Sumiton	
Alabama	Jefferson	West Jefferson	80.75	129.95	81	CR 45 – West Jefferson	
Alabama	Jefferson	Graysville	85.24	137.18	85	US 78 east (SR 4 east) / SR 5 – Birmingham, Adamsville, Graysville	Eastern end of US 78/SR 4 overlap
Alabama	Jefferson	Graysville			86	I-222 north to I-422	Proposed interchange; proposed southern terminus of I-222
Alabama	Jefferson	Graysville	87.26	140.43	87	CR 112 – Graysville	
Alabama	Jefferson	Forestdale	88.99	143.22	89	CR 65 (Hillcrest Road) – Adamsville, Graysville	
Alabama	Jefferson	Forestdale	91.75	147.66	91	CR 105 (Cherry Avenue) – Brookside, Forestdale	
Alabama	Jefferson	Birmingham	93.60	150.63	93	CR 77 – Coalburg	Directional signs on exit ramp north to Coalburg and south to Birmingham
Alabama	Jefferson	Birmingham	96.48	155.27	95	I-65 – Birmingham, Huntsville, Montgomery, Mobile	I-65 exit 265A; signed as left exit 95A (north) & 95B (south)
Alabama	Jefferson	Birmingham			95C	US 31 (SR 3) – Montgomery, Decatur	Proposed future eastern terminus
1.000 mi = 1.609 km; 1.000 km = 0.621 mi: Concurrency terminus; Unopened

== Future auxiliary routes ==
=== Interstate 222 ===
Future Interstate 222
- Location: Brookside–Graysville, Alabama
- Length: 2.26 mi (3.64 km)

Interstate 222 (I-222) is a future auxiliary Interstate Highway that will be a connector between I-22 and the proposed I-422 near Birmingham, Alabama. There will be no exits other than its termini. The highway has been proposed because an interchange directly between I-22 and I-422 cannot be built due to environmental issues. AASHTO approved the designation on May 18, 2012. Construction on this new route has not been scheduled at this time.

=== Interstate 422 ===
Corridor X-1
- Location: Bessemer–Argo, Alabama
- Length: 52.5 mi (84.5 km)

I-422 is a future proposed northwestern bypass of Birmingham, connecting between I-20/I-59 from the southwest and I-59 in the northeast. It will also be connected with I-22 via I-222 in Brookside, located northwest of Birmingham. It was first proposed in May 2009 by US Representative Spencer Bachus; on May 18, 2012, it was approved by AASHTO. Construction on a short 1.34-mile (2.16 km) section of the route between SR 79 and 75 was started shortly afterwards, but issues with funding and local opposition held up the project. More funding for the interstate was provided in Spring 2023. It covered the construction of I-422 between SR 79 to US 31 for a total of 10 miles (16 km). The construction of this part of the interstate, which will be four lanes, was expected to begin later in the Spring and be completed by 2028, but the completion date was delayed to 2032. A complaint has been filed over construction resuming, and although ALDOT expected to break ground on the resumption of the project in November 2023, no new information was made public for several months. Work finally resumed on the initial phase between SR 75 and SR 79 in late-June 2024 and was completed on September 29, 2026.
