= Alabama State Route 17 =

State highway in Alabama, United States

State Route 17

Route information
- Maintained by ALDOT
- Length: 346.562 mi (557.737 km)

Major junctions
- South end: I-65 / US 45 / US 98 in Mobile
- I-20 / I-59 in York; US 82 in Reform; I-22 / US 43 / US 78 / US 278 / SR 171 in Hamilton; US 43 / US 72 / SR 20 / SR 133 / SR 157 in Florence
- North end: SR 13 at Tennessee state line north of Zip City

Location
- Country: United States
- State: Alabama
- Counties: Mobile, Washington, Choctaw, Sumter, Pickens, Lamar, Marion, Franklin, Colbert, Lauderdale

Highway system
- Alabama State Highway System; Interstate; US; State
← SR 16	→ SR 18

State Route 17 (SR 17) is a major north-to-south highway within the U.S. state of Alabama. Covering 346.562 miles (557.737 km), it travels the length of the state between US 90 in Mobile and SR 13 at the Tennessee state line, north of Zip City.

Between Mobile and Deer Park in Washington County, SR 17 is the unsigned partner route assigned to U.S. Route 45 (US 45), and from Hamilton to Florence, it serves as the signed partner route assigned to US 43. It is the longest state route in Alabama that is not entirely the unsigned partner of a U.S. Route.

== Route description ==
The southern terminus of US 45 and SR 17 is at their intersection with US 98 and unsigned SR 42 in Mobile. US 45 and SR 17 assume a northwestward trajectory as they leave Mobile heading towards the Mississippi state line. Approximately 5 miles (8.0 km) north of an interchange with Interstate 65 (I-65) northwest of downtown Mobile, the routes quickly enter rural areas of Mobile County via a two-lane highway. Near the small community of Deer Park in southern Washington County, SR 17 diverts from US 45 and becomes a signed route.

After the split from US 45, SR 17 assumes a general northerly orientation as it passes through rural areas and small towns in western Alabama. The route passes through the Black Belt, historically one of the poorer areas of the state. After leaving Mobile, the route does not pass through any towns whose population exceeds 5,000 until it approaches Hamilton in Marion County. At Hamilton, SR 17 once again becomes an unsigned route upon the second junction it has with US 43; US 45 and SR 17 are the southern terminus of US 43 in Mobile.

Between Hamilton and Muscle Shoals, SR 17 is a signed route. At Muscle Shoals, US 43, SR 17 and SR 13 intersect US 72 and several other state routes. At this point, SR 17 once again becomes a signed route as it leads through Muscle Shoals and Florence as it heads towards its northern terminus at the Tennessee state line, where it becomes Tennessee State Route 13.

== History ==
State Route 29
- Existed: 1928–1957

SR 17 was designated in 1940 between Kennedy and York. In 1952, the route was extended south to Mobile; from York to Deer Park, SR 29 was renumbered as part of SR 17, and from Deer Park to Mobile the route traveled concurrently with US 45. SR 17 was extended north to the Tennessee state line in 1956. To accomplish this, SR 17 replaced old SR 19 up to Hamilton, was concurrent with US 43 up to Florence, and replaced old SR 34 the rest of the way to the Tennessee state line.

== Major intersections ==
County	Location	mi	km	Destinations	Notes
Mobile	Mobile	0.000	0.000	US 98 (SR 42) US 45 begins	Southern end of US 45 concurrency; southern termini of US 45 and SR 17
Mobile	Prichard	4.340	6.985	I-65 to I-10 – Montgomery	I-65 exit 8
Mobile	Prichard	6.297	10.134	SR 213 north (Shelton Beach Road) – University of Mobile, Chickasabogue Park	Southern terminus of SR 213
Mobile	Prichard	6.477	10.424	SR 217 north (Lott Road)	Southern terminus of SR 217
Mobile	Prichard	9.618	15.479	SR 158 to I-65 – Saraland	Interchange
Washington		43.054	69.289	US 45 north (SR 57) – Meridian	Northern end of US 45 concurrency; southern terminus of unsigned SR 57
Washington	Chatom	59.848	96.316	SR 56 east	Southern end of SR 56 concurrency; serves Roy Wilcox Airport
Washington	Chatom	59.897	96.395	SR 56 west	Northern end of SR 56 concurrency
Choctaw	Silas	84.206	135.516	US 84 (SR 12) – Waynesboro, Grove Hill	
Choctaw	Butler	108.735	174.992	SR 10 – Meridian, Sweet Water	
Choctaw	Jachin	119.536	192.375	SR 156 east – Pennington	Western terminus of SR 156
Sumter		136.581	219.806	US 80 (SR 8) – Cuba, Demopolis	Interchange
Sumter	York	140.392	225.939	US 11 (SR 7) – Meridian, Livingston	
Sumter	York	142.717	229.681	I-20 / I-59 – Meridian, Tuscaloosa	I-20/I-59 exit 8
Sumter		151.013	243.032	SR 28 east – Livingston	Western terminus of SR 28
Sumter		162.215	261.060	SR 116 east – Gainesville	Western terminus of SR 116
Sumter		164.2	264.3	CR 30 west	To MS 16
Pickens		179.671	289.152	SR 32 west – Macon	Eastern terminus of SR 32
Pickens	Aliceville	189.116	304.353	SR 14 west – Pickensville	Southern end of SR 14 concurrency
Pickens	Aliceville	189.402	304.813	SR 14 east (3rd Street SE) – Eutaw	Northern end of SR 14 concurrency
Pickens	Carrollton	199.975	321.829	SR 86 west (Columbus Street) / CR 35 north (Phoenix Avenue)	Traffic circle; southern end of SR 86 concurrency
Pickens	Carrollton	200.030	321.917	SR 86 east (Tuscaloosa Street east)	Northern end of SR 86 concurrency
Pickens	Reform	209.739	337.542	US 82 west (SR 6 west) – Columbus	Southern end of US 82 concurrency
Pickens	Reform	209.881	337.771	US 82 east (SR 6 east) – Tuscaloosa	Northern end of US 82 concurrency
Lamar	Kennedy	224.585	361.435	SR 96 east – Downtown, Belk	Southern end of SR 96 concurrency
Lamar	Millport	228.843	368.287	SR 96 west – Columbus	Northern end of SR 96 concurrency
Lamar	Vernon	243.195	391.384	SR 18 – Columbus, Fayette	
Lamar	Sulligent	254.004	408.780	US 278 / SR 118 – Amory, Guin	
Lamar		266.778	429.338	SR 19 north – Vina	Southern terminus of SR 19
Marion		274.006	440.970	I-22 / US 78 / SR 4 (Appalachian Development Corridor X) – Tupelo, Birmingham	I-22 exit 11
Marion	Hamilton	277.539	446.656	US 43 south / US 278 west / SR 171 south – Guin, Winfield	Southern end of US 43/US 278 concurrency; northern terminus of SR 171
Marion	Hamilton	277.871	447.190	US 278 east / SR 74 to I-22 / US 78 west – Double Springs, Tupelo	Northern end of US 278 concurrency
Marion		283.176	455.728	SR 187 north – Hodges	Southern terminus of SR 187
Marion	Hackleburg	291.677	469.409	SR 172 / SR 253 south – Hodges, Bear Creek	
Franklin	Phil Campbell	301.661	485.476	SR 13 south – Phil Campbell, Haleyville, Tuscaloosa	Southern end of SR 13 concurrency
Franklin	Russellville	308.255	496.088	SR 24 (Appalachian Development Corridor V) to SR 243 – Double Springs, Moulton, Red Bay	Interchange; serves Russellville Municipal Airport
Colbert	Muscle Shoals–Tuscumbia line	325.257	523.450	US 72 west (SR 2 west) – Corinth MS, Tuscumbia US 72 Alt. / SR 20 east – Decatur	Southern end of US 72/SR 20 concurrency; western terminus of US 72 Alt.
Colbert	Muscle Shoals–Sheffield line	328.585	528.806	SR 184 east (Second Street)	Western terminus of SR 184; serves Northwest Alabama Regional Airport
Tennessee River		330.265	531.510	O'Neal Bridge	
Lauderdale	Florence	331.012	532.712	SR 20 west – Savannah Tn	Interchange; no northbound entrance; northern end of SR 20 concurrency
Lauderdale	Florence	332.2	534.6	Stadium	Interchange; no southbound entrance
Lauderdale	Florence	332.850	535.670	US 43 north / US 72 east / SR 2 east (Florence Boulevard north) / SR 13 north SR 157 south (Helton Drive) – Muscle Shoals	Interchange; northern end of US 43/US 72/SR 13 concurrencies; southern end of SR 157 concurrency; SR 157 south serves North Alabama Medical Center
Lauderdale	Florence	335.030	539.179	SR 133 south (Cox Creek Parkway east)	Southern end of SR 133 concurrency
Lauderdale	Florence	335.368	539.722	SR 133 north / SR 157 north (Cox Creek Parkway west) – Savannah	Northern end of SR 133/SR 157 concurrency
Lauderdale		346.562	557.737	SR 13 north – Waynesboro, Wayne Medical Center	Continuation into Tennessee
1.000 mi = 1.609 km; 1.000 km = 0.621 mi: Concurrency terminus; Incomplete access
