= U.S. Route 278 in Alabama =

Segment of American highway

U.S. Route 278
- State Route 74
- US 278 highlighted in red

Route information
- Auxiliary route of US 78
- Maintained by ALDOT
- Length: 199.182 mi (320.552 km)

Major junctions
- West end: US 278 at the Mississippi state line in Gattman, MS
- US 43 in Guin and Hamilton; I-22 / US 78 near Hamilton; I-65 in Cullman; US 31 in Cullman; US 231 in Blountsville; US 431 west of Attalla; US 11 in Attalla; I-59 in Attalla; US 411 in Gadsden
- East end: US 278 / SR 6 at the Georgia state line near Esom Hill, GA

Location
- Country: United States
- State: Alabama
- Counties: Lamar, Marion, Winston, Cullman, Blount, Etowah, Calhoun, Cherokee, Cleburne

Highway system
- United States Numbered Highway System; List; Special; Divided; Alabama State Highway System; Interstate; US; State
← SR 277	→ SR 279
← SR 73	SR 74	→ SR 75

U.S. Route 278 (US 278), mostly internally designated by the Alabama Department of Transportation as State Route 74 (SR 74), is a major east–west U.S. highway across the northern part of the U.S. state of Alabama. West of Hamilton, SR 74 continues west to end at US 78 (unsigned SR 4), while US 278 turns south along US 43/SR 17/SR 171 to Guin, where it turns west along SR 118 to the Mississippi state line.

== Route description ==
US 278 enters Alabama near Sulligent. After passing through the city, the route continues on a winding path until it reaches Guin, where it turns north and gains U.S. 43. It then junctions with I-22/US 78. It eventually reaches Hamilton, where it turns off of U.S. 43's right of way.

Leaving Hamilton, the route enters the Warrior Basin, meandering along rugged terrain. After traversing Bankhead National Forest, the route climbs up Brindley Mountain. There are several major grades (mostly uphill heading west and downhill heading east) as the route continues to Interstate 65 and downtown Cullman, where it reaches U.S. 31.

East of Cullman, the route follows a relatively straight route to its intersection with U.S. 231, descending Brindley Mountain in the process. The route crosses several mountain valleys and plateaus, including the southernmost extent of Sand Mountain before descending towards the Coosa River. It is concurrent with U.S. 431 through Attalla, where it has a brief concurrency with U.S. 11 and crosses the Alabama & Tennessee River Railway, Interstate 59, and Gadsden, where it crosses the Coosa River and intersects U.S. 411. On the eastern side of the city, the route turns off the U.S. 431 right of way, heading east towards Piedmont.

Leaving Piedmont, the route begins its climb into the Piedmont, crossing into Georgia west of Cedartown.

== History ==
From its creation in 1955 to 1965, US-278 followed a very different route from Whitehouse to Double Springs. It followed SR-129 from Whitehouse to Haleyville; In Haleyville, the route followed SR-13 to SR-195. It would then follow SR-195 to Double Springs, where it would turn onto its present-day routing. Oddly, State Route 74 followed the present day routing between the two cities via Natural Bridge from 1956 onward.

The routing of U.S. Route 278 in between Double Springs and Cullman has witnessed several minor changes from 1955 to the present day. From its creation until around 1982, the route followed present-day Winston County Roads 3800 and 3700, crossing Brushy Creek at a now-abandoned bridge before climbing up to join its present-day route into Addison. On the east side of Addison, the route followed Main Street, descending down and crossing Rock Creek at another abandoned bridge before rejoining the modern-day route. Both of these routings have been replaced with straighter routings. On the west side of Cullman, the route previously descended down into a hollow where it proceeded to cross Vest Creek before climbing up the hollow and rejoining the modern-day routing; this routing was replaced in 2012 with a much straighter bridge across the same creek. Until at least 1997, the route followed 4th Street into Cullman, where it engaged in a short concurrency with U.S. Route 31 before rejoining the modern-day route; this was replaced with the modern-day routing along 3rd Street.

During the 1960s–1980s, there were some different variations of the routing of US 278 through the cities of Gadsden and Attalla, however, the construction of four-lane segments on the western side of Gadsden and in Attalla allowed the highway to take its current route which has been in place since the mid-1980s.

U.S. Route 278 Business
- Location: Piedmont
- Existed: ?–1980s

Until the mid-1980s, a US 278 Business (US 278 Bus.) existed in the city of Piedmont. US 278 is carried on a four-lane segment that bypasses the center of Piedmont. US 278 Bus. began where the four-lane segment began on the northeast side of Piedmont, then traveled southwest into the center of the city and intersected SR 9 and then traveled to the north, concurrent with SR 9 until it intersected the four-lane US 278 on the northern edge of the city.

== Major intersections ==
County	Location	mi	km	Destinations	Notes
Lamar		0.000	0.000	US 278 west – Tupelo SR 118 begins	Continuation into Mississippi; western end of SR 118 concurrency
Lamar	Sulligent	5.741	9.239	SR 17 – Vernon, Hamilton	
Marion	Guin	17.785	28.622	SR 142 east	Western terminus of SR 142
Marion	Guin	19.408	31.234	SR 107 south – Fayette	Northern terminus of SR 107
Marion	Guin	19.692	31.691	US 43 south / SR 118 west / SR 171 south (11th Avenue East) / SR 142 west (11th Avenue West) – Winfield	Southern end of US 43 and SR 171 concurrencies; eastern end of SR 118 concurrency
Marion	Hamilton	28.054	45.149	I-22 / US 78 (SR 4) – Tupelo, Birmingham	I-22/US 78 exit 16
Marion	Hamilton	32.811	52.804	SR 17 south / SR 171 ends – Vernon	Southern end of SR 17 concurrency; northern end of SR 171 concurrency
Marion	Hamilton	33.163	53.371	US 43 north / SR 17 north (Military Street North) / SR 74 west (Bexar Avenue West) – Hackleburg	Northern end of US 43 and SR 17 concurrencies; western end of SR 74 concurrency
Marion		43.486	69.984	SR 253 – Hackleburg, Winfield	
Marion		47.781	76.896	SR 241 north to SR 129 – Phil Campbell	Southern terminus of SR 241
Marion		48.342	77.799	SR 129 – Haleyville, Brilliant, Fayette	
Winston	Natural Bridge	56.402	90.770	SR 13 south – Tuscaloosa	Western end of SR 13 concurrency
Winston	Natural Bridge	56.857	91.502	SR 5 south / SR 13 north – Russellville, Jasper	Eastern end of SR 13 concurrency; northern terminus of SR 5
Winston	Double Springs	69.277	111.491	SR 195 north – Haleyville	Western end of SR 195 concurrency
Winston	Double Springs	69.742	112.239	SR 33 north / SR 195 south – Double Springs, Moulton	Eastern end of SR 195 concurrency; southern terminus of SR 33
Cullman	Cullman	105.738	170.169	I-65 – Birmingham, Huntsville	I-65 exit 308
Cullman	Cullman	107.674	173.285	US 31 (SR 3 / 2nd Avenue SW) / SR 69	Western end of SR 69 concurrency
Cullman	Cullman	110.736	178.212	SR 69 north – Arab, Guntersville	Eastern end of SR 69 concurrency
Cullman	Cullman	111.173	178.916	SR 157 north / CR 719 south – Moulton, Muscle Shoals, Florence	Southern terminus of SR 157
Cullman	Holly Pond	120.978	194.695	SR 91 south – Hanceville, Garden City	Northern terminus of SR 91
Blount		126.822	204.100	US 231 (SR 53) – Arab, Birmingham	
Blount	Brooksville	129.322	208.124	SR 79 – Guntersville, Birmingham	
Blount	Snead	134.880	217.068	SR 75 – Albertville, Oneonta	
Etowah		146.360	235.544	SR 132 west – Altoona, Oneonta	Eastern terminus of SR 132
Etowah		148.539	239.050	SR 179 north	Southern terminus of SR 179
Etowah	Attalla	152.840	245.972	SR 77 – Albertville, Lincoln	
Etowah	Attalla	153.338	246.774	US 431 north (SR 1) – Albertville, Guntersville, Huntsville	Western end of US 431 concurrency
Etowah	Attalla	155.253	249.855	US 11 south (SR 7 / 3rd Street SW)	Western end of US 11 concurrency
Etowah	Attalla	155.585	250.390	US 11 north (SR 7 / 3rd Street NW)	Eastern end of US 11 concurrency
Etowah	Attalla	156.428	251.746	I-59 – Birmingham, Chattanooga	I-59 exit 183
Etowah	Gadsden	159.707	257.024	SR 211 north (Noccalula Road)	Southern terminus of SR 211
Etowah	Gadsden	161.182	259.397	US 411 (SR 25 / Albert Rains Boulevard) – Centre, Rainbow City, Ashville	Interchange
Etowah	Gadsden	161.469	259.859	SR 291 south (Hood Avenue) to I-759	Northern terminus of SR 291
Etowah	Gadsden	163.243	262.714	US 431 south (SR 1 / East Meighan Boulevard) – Anniston	Eastern end of US 431 concurrency
Calhoun	Piedmont	184.081	296.250	SR 21 south (Tom Bible Memorial Highway) – Jacksonville, Anniston, Atmore, Pensacola	Northern terminus of SR 21
Calhoun	Piedmont	184.605	297.093	SR 9 south (N. Main Street)	Western end of SR 9 concurrency
Calhoun	Piedmont	184.693	297.235	SR 9 north – Centre	Eastern end of SR 9 concurrency
Cherokee	No major junctions				
Cleburne		199.182	320.552	US 278 east / SR 6 east – Atlanta	Continuation into Georgia
1.000 mi = 1.609 km; 1.000 km = 0.621 mi: Concurrency terminus

== State Route 74 ==
State Route 74
- Bexar Avenue W
- Location: Hamilton
- Length: 4.9 mi (7.9 km) Signed Segment
- Existed: 1934–present

State Route 74 (SR 74) exists mostly as the unsigned state route for all of US 278 throughout the state, east of Hamilton. It is signed however along a separate 4.9-mile-long (7.9 km) east-west segment in Marion County. Consisting of the former alignment of US 78 on the western side of town, it connects Hamilton with I-22. It is entirely a rural, two-lane highway except within Hamilton, where it is an undivided four-lane boulevard and is known as Bexar Avenue W.

The entire route is in Marion County.

Location	mi	km	Destinations	Notes
Fikes Crossing	0.0– 0.2	0.0– 0.32	I-22 (SR 4) / US 78 – Birmingham, Tupelo CR 94 west – Bexar	Western terminus; I-22/US 78 exit 7; road continues (along with former US 78) as CR 94 west
Fikes Crossing	0.3	0.48	SR 19 – Sulligent, Vina, Red Bay	
Hamilton	4.9	7.9	US 278 west / US 43 / SR 17 (Military Street)	Western end of US 278 concurrency; SR 74 becomes unsigned
1.000 mi = 1.609 km; 1.000 km = 0.621 mi: Concurrency terminus

== See also ==
U.S. Route 278
Previous state: Mississippi	Alabama	Next state: Georgia
