= Alabama State Route 44 =

State highway in Alabama, United States

State Route 44

Route information
- Maintained by ALDOT
- Length: 10.015 mi (16.118 km)
- Existed: 1959–present

Major junctions
- West end: US 43 / SR 118 at Guin
- SR 233 at Twin; I-22 / US 78 near Twin
- East end: SR 129 at Brilliant

Location
- Country: United States
- State: Alabama
- Counties: Marion

Highway system
- Alabama State Highway System; Interstate; US; State
← US 43	→ US 45

State Route 44 (SR 44) is a 10.015-mile-long (16.118 km) state highway in Marion County, Alabama in the northwest part of the U.S. state of Alabama. The southern terminus of the highway is at its intersection with US 43/SR 118 at Guin. The highway’s eastern terminus is at its intersection with SR 129 at Brilliant.

== Route description ==
SR 44 is routed along a two-lane roadway for its entire length. The highway serves as a connector between Guin and Brilliant, traveling through rural areas of Marion County. Roughly 2 miles (3.2 km) before its eastern terminus, the highway has an interchange with I-22/US 78.

== Major intersections ==
The entire route is in Marion County.

Location	mi	km	Destinations	Notes
Guin	0.000	0.000	US 43 / SR 118 (SR 171)	Southern terminus
	4.345	6.993	SR 253 south – Winfield	West end of SR 253 concurrency
	4.791	7.710	SR 253 north – Hackleburg	East end of SR 253 concurrency
	5.930	9.543	I-22 / US 78 – Tupelo, Birmingham	I-22 exit 26
Brilliant	10.015	16.118	SR 129 – Brilliant, Haleyville, Winfield	Northern terminus
1.000 mi = 1.609 km; 1.000 km = 0.621 mi: Concurrency terminus
