= Byrd, Alabama =

Unincorporated community in Alabama, United States

- Unincorporated community
- Location within Alabama Location within the United States
- Coordinates: 34°04′47″N 88°07′56″W
- Country: United States
- State: Alabama
- County: Marion
- Elevation: 404 ft (123 m)
- Time zone: UTC-6 (Central (CST))
  - Summer (DST): UTC-5 (CDT)
- Area codes: 205, 659
- GNIS feature ID: 163214

Byrd is an unincorporated community in Marion County, in the U.S. state of Alabama.

== History ==
The community is named after the Byrd family, who were early settlers of the area. They also donated land for a school to be built. The school served students in grades one through nine.
