= Pull Tight, Alabama =

Unincorporated community in Alabama, United States

- Unincorporated community
- Location within Alabama Location within the United States
- Coordinates: 34°01′16″N 87°47′05″W
- Country: United States
- State: Alabama
- County: Marion
- Elevation: 607 ft (185 m)
- Time zone: UTC-6 (Central (CST))
  - Summer (DST): UTC-5 (CDT)
- Area codes: 205, 659

Pull Tight is an unincorporated community in Marion County, Alabama, United States.

It is unclear why the name "Pull Tight" was applied to this community. The name may be commendatory, as local residents "pull tight" (i.e. helped one another). Pull Tight has been frequently noted on lists of unusual place names.
