= Pikeville, Marion County, Alabama =

- Ghost town
- Location within Alabama Location within the United States
- Coordinates: 34°02′17″N 87°57′04″W
- Country: United States
- State: Alabama
- County: Marion
- Elevation: 702 ft (214 m)
- Time zone: UTC-6 (Central (CST))
  - Summer (DST): UTC-5 (CDT)
- Area codes: 205, 659
- GNIS feature ID: 156885

Pikeville is a ghost town in Marion County in the U.S. state of Alabama.

Pikeville served as the first permanent county seat of Marion County from 1820 to 1882. It was incorporated as a town on January 12, 1827. The county courthouse was destroyed by fire in 1866, and was later rebuilt. John Dabney Terrell, Jr. served as Probate Judge for Marion County for over forty years. He and his family resided in Pikeville, until its demise. It is now a ghost town. However, the courthouse still stands along with the city cemetery, a civil war cemetery, a grave of an unknown War of 1812 soldier and remnants of General Jackson's Military Road.

A post office operated under the name Pikeville from 1824 to 1907.

== Demographics ==
Historical population
Census	Pop.	Note	%±
1880	57		—
U.S. Decennial Census

Pikeville appeared on the 1880 U.S. Census, shortly before it lost its title as Marion County seat. It was recorded as having 57 residents. This was the only time it appeared as a separate community on the census.
