= Winfield City School District =

School district in Alabama, United States

Address
- P.O. Box 70 Winfield, Marion County, Alabama, 35594; United States

District information
- Grades: preK–12
- Superintendent: Chris Cook
- Schools: 1 preschool, 1 elementary, 1 middle, 1 high, 1 core academy

Other information
- Website: www.winfield.k12.al.us

Winfield City School District is a school district located in Marion County, Alabama.

Winfield City Schools consist of Winfield Elementary School, Winfield Middle School, and Winfield High School.

Winfield City Schools is the first school district to have all of its schools STEM certified and accredited.

The school district has 1,280 students in grades preK to K-12 with a student-teacher ratio of 16 to 1. According to state test scores, 58% of students are at least proficient in math and 53% in reading.
