= Texas, Alabama =

Unincorporated community in Alabama, United States

- Unincorporated community
- Location within Alabama Location within the United States
- Coordinates: 33°55′47″N 87°40′43″W
- Country: United States
- State: Alabama
- County: Marion
- Elevation: 420 ft (130 m)
- Time zone: UTC-6 (Central (CST))
  - Summer (DST): UTC-5 (CDT)
- Area codes: 205, 659
- GNIS feature ID: 127780

Texas is an unincorporated community in Marion County, in the U.S. state of Alabama.

== History ==
A post office called Texas was established in 1876, and remained in operation until 1929. The community was named after the state of Texas.
