= Gu-Win, Alabama =

- Town
- Location in Marion and Fayette counties, Alabama
- Coordinates: 33°57′12″N 87°52′30″W
- Country: United States
- State: Alabama
- Counties: Marion, Fayette

Area
  - Total: 1.94 sq mi (5.0 km^{2})
  - Land: 1.94 sq mi (5.0 km^{2})
  - Water: 0.00 sq mi (0 km^{2})
- Elevation: 522 ft (159 m)

Population (2020)
  - Total: 141
  - Density: 72.57/sq mi (28.02/km^{2})
- Time zone: UTC-6 (Central (CST))
  - Summer (DST): UTC-5 (CDT)
- FIPS code: 01-32536
- GNIS feature ID: 2406632

Gu-Win is a town in Fayette and Marion counties in the U.S. state of Alabama. It incorporated in 1956. At the 2020 census the population was 141, down from 176 at the 2010 census. Although a small portion of the town is within Fayette County, all of the population as of 2010 resided in Marion County.

The town's unusual name is taken from the names of its two neighboring cities, Guin and Winfield. "Gu-Win" and "Guin" are not the same, though the pronunciation is virtually the same, leading to occasional confusion by visitors. Gu-Win - Goo-win and Guin - G-you-in

== History ==
The area Gu-Win occupies is between Guin and Winfield. Until the 1950s, it was known as "Ear Gap". Not wanting to be annexed into Guin or Winfield, it pursued incorporation for itself, and chose the name of the local drive-in theater, "Gu-Win". As of 2019, the theater still operates, but has been renamed the Blue Moon.

== Geography ==
Gu-Win is located in southern Marion County with a small portion extending south into Fayette County. U.S. Route 43 passes through the town, leading northwest 3 miles (5 km) to Guin and southeast the same distance to Winfield.

According to the U.S. Census Bureau, the town of Gu-Win has a total area of 1.9 square miles (4.9 km^{2}), all of it recorded as land. The town sits at a low gap between two subwatersheds that each lead to the Tombigbee River: the Buttahatchee River to the west, and Luxapallila Creek to the southeast. The local streams rising in the gap are Hughes Branch flowing to the west, and an unnamed tributary of Luxapallila Creek flowing to the southeast.

== Demographics ==
Historical population
Census	Pop.	Note	%±
1960	80		—
1970	231		188.8%
1980	266		15.2%
1990	243		−8.6%
2000	204		−16.0%
2010	176		−13.7%
2020	141		−19.9%
U.S. Decennial Census; 2013 Estimate

As of the census of 2000, there were 204 people, 86 households, and 63 families residing in the town. The population density was 106.4 inhabitants per square mile (41.1/km^{2}). There were 100 housing units at an average density of 52.1 per square mile (20.1/km^{2}). The racial makeup of the town was 100.00% White. 2.94% of the population were Hispanic or Latino of any race.

There were 86 households, out of which 31.4% had children under the age of 18 living with them, 62.8% were married couples living together, 8.1% had a female householder with no husband present, and 25.6% were non-families. 25.6% of all households were made up of individuals, and 14.0% had someone living alone who was 65 years of age or older. The average household size was 2.37 and the average family size was 2.81.

In the town, the population was spread out, with 20.1% under the age of 18, 10.3% from 18 to 24, 29.9% from 25 to 44, 20.1% from 45 to 64, and 19.6% who were 65 years of age or older. The median age was 38 years. For every 100 females, there were 108.2 males. For every 100 females age 18 and over, there were 94.0 males.

The median income for a household in the town was $29,375, and the median income for a family was $42,500. Males had a median income of $39,375 versus $18,906 for females. The per capita income for the town was $16,868. About 11.3% of families and 9.9% of the population were below the poverty line, including 5.3% of those under the age of eighteen and 6.8% of those 65 or over.
