= Twin, Alabama =

- Town
- Location in Marion County, Alabama
- Coordinates: 34°00′19″N 87°51′02″W
- Country: United States
- State: Alabama
- Counties: Marion

Area
  - Total: 3.38 sq mi (8.8 km^{2})
  - Land: 3.38 sq mi (8.8 km^{2})
  - Water: 0.00 sq mi (0 km^{2})
- Elevation: 587 ft (179 m)

Population (2020)
  - Total: 359
  - Density: 106.21/sq mi (41.01/km^{2})
- Time zone: UTC-6 (CST)
  - Summer (DST): UTC-5 (CDT)
- ZIP code: 35563
- Area codes: 205, 659
- FIPS code: 01-77352
- GNIS feature ID: 2424938

Twin, also known as Yampertown, is a town in Marion County, Alabama, United States. It is about equidistant from Brilliant, Guin and Winfield. It incorporated on August 6, 2002, becoming the 10th incorporated community in Marion County. It had a population of 359 as of the 2020 census.

== Geography ==
Twin is in southern Marion County, bordered to the west and east by the city of Guin. I-22/US 78 passes through the town, with access from exit 26 (SR 44). Hamilton, the Marion county seat, is 16 miles (26 km) to the northwest, and Jasper is 38 miles (61 km) to the southeast. SR 44 leads east 6 miles (10 km) to Brilliant and southwest 5 miles (8 km) to Guin, while SR 253 leads southeast 6 miles (9.7 km) to Winfield and north 25 miles (40 km) to Hackleburg.

According to the U.S. Census Bureau, the town of Twin has an area of 3.38 square miles (8.8 km^{2}), all of it recorded as land. Yampertown, the town center, is in the valley of Luxapallila Creek where it is joined by Cooper Creek. The Luxapallila is a southwest-flowing tributary of the Tombigbee River.

== Demographics ==
Historical population
Census	Pop.	Note	%±
2010	399		—
2020	359		−10.0%
U.S. Decennial Census
