= Marion County, Alabama =

County in Alabama, United States

- County
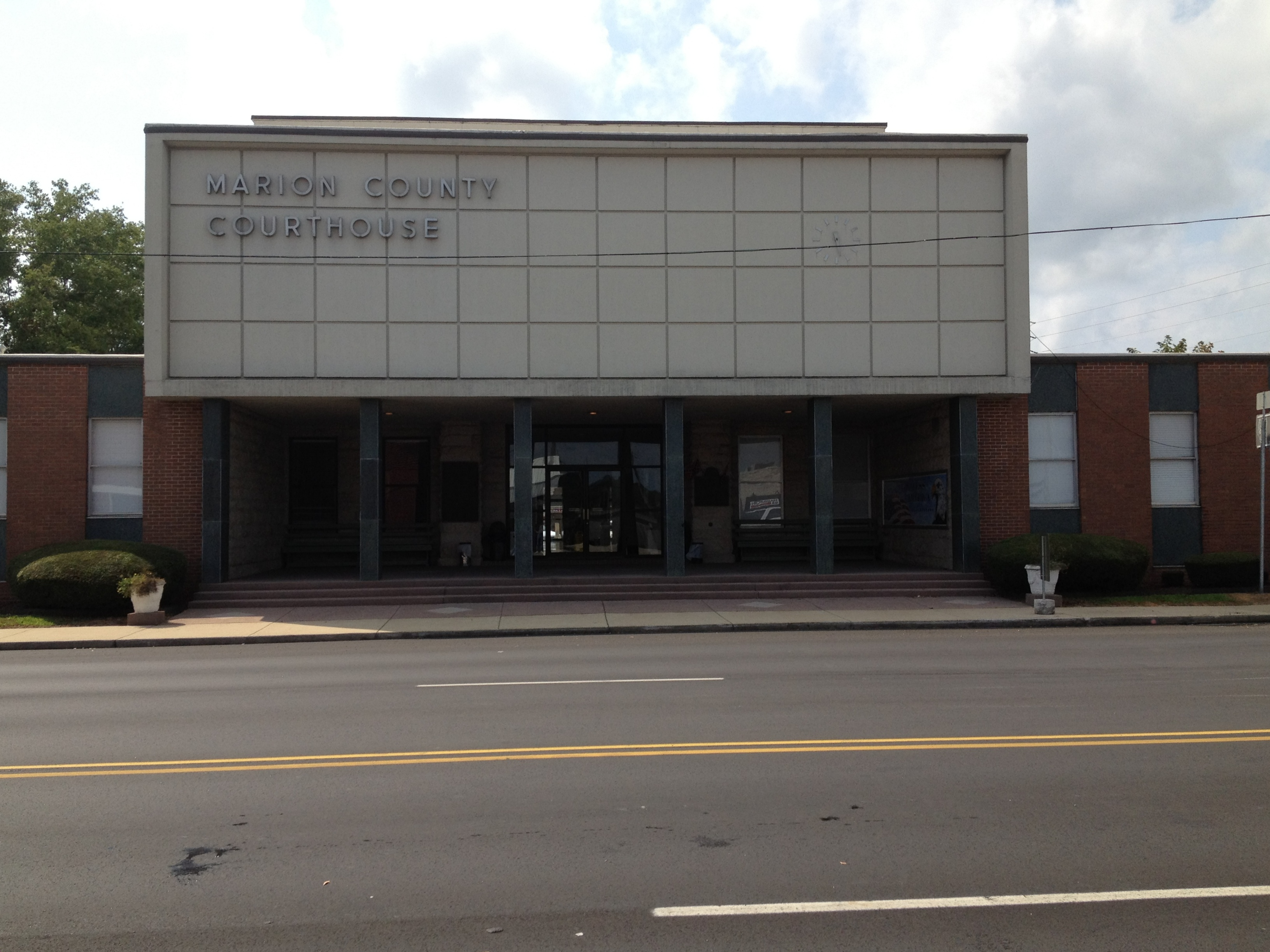
- Marion County Courthouse in Hamilton

- Location within the U.S. state of Alabama
- Coordinates: 34°08′11″N 87°53′03″W
- Country: United States
- State: Alabama
- Founded: February 13, 1818
- Named for: Francis Marion
- Seat: Hamilton
- Largest city: Hamilton

Area
  - Total: 744 sq mi (1,930 km^{2})
  - Land: 742 sq mi (1,920 km^{2})
  - Water: 1.3 sq mi (3.4 km^{2}) 0.2%

Population (2020)
  - Total: 29,341
  - Estimate (2025): 29,097 ▼
  - Density: 39.5/sq mi (15.3/km^{2})
- Time zone: UTC−6 (Central)
  - Summer (DST): UTC−5 (CDT)
- Congressional district: 4th
- Website: www.marioncountyal.org
- County Number 49 on Alabama Licence Plates

Marion County is a county of the U.S. state of Alabama. As of the 2020 census the population was 29,341. The county seat is Hamilton. The county was created by an act of the Alabama Territorial General Assembly on February 13, 1818. The county seat was originally established in Pikeville in 1820, and moved to Hamilton in 1881. The county was named by planter and US Indian agent John Dabney Terrell, Sr., in recognition of General Francis Marion of South Carolina.

Marion County is located in the northwestern part of the state, bounded on the west by the state of Mississippi. It encompasses 743 square miles (1,920 km^{2}). The county is a prohibition or dry county, however, the sale of alcohol is permitted within the cities of Guin, Hamilton, and Winfield.

== History ==
The county was created by the Alabama Territorial General Assembly on February 13, 1818, preceding Alabama's statehood by almost two years. It was created from land acquired from the Chickasaw Indians by the Treaty of 1816. Marion County included all of its current territory and parts of what are now Winston, Walker, Fayette, and Lamar counties in Alabama as well as portions of present-day Lowndes, Monroe, and Itawamba counties in Mississippi. The county was named in honor of General Francis Marion (1732–1795), an American Revolutionary War hero from South Carolina who was known as "The Swamp Fox." Many early settlers of Marion County came from Kentucky and Tennessee after General Andrew Jackson established the Military Road. The first towns in the area were Pikeville, Hamilton (formerly named Toll Gate), Winfield, and Guin.

The county's first seat was settled in 1818 at Cotton Gin Port, near present-day Amory, Mississippi. It was moved in 1819 to the home of Henry Greer along the Buttahatchee River, in 1820, the first permanent county seat was established at Pikeville, now a ghost town, located between present day Hamilton and Guin, along U.S. Highway 43. Pikeville served as the county seat of Marion County until 1882. Although the town is now abandoned, the home of Judge John Dabney Terrell Sr., which served as the third county courthouse, still stands. In 1882, Hamilton became the county seat. The first courthouse in Hamilton was destroyed by fire on March 30, 1887, and the second courthouse, constructed in the same place, also burned. A new courthouse, constructed of local sandstone opened in 1901. In 1959, the building was significantly remodeled to give the structure its current 1950s "international style" design theme.

== Geography ==
According to the United States Census Bureau, the county has a total area of 744 square miles (1,930 km^{2}), of which 742 square miles (1,920 km^{2}) is land and 1.3 square miles (3.4 km^{2}) (0.2%) is water.

=== Adjacent counties ===
- Franklin County (north)
- Winston County (east)
- Walker County (southeast)
- Fayette County (south)
- Lamar County (southwest)
- Monroe County, Mississippi (southwest)
- Itawamba County, Mississippi (west)

== Demographics ==
Historical population
Census	Pop.	Note	%±
1830	4,058		—
1840	5,847		44.1%
1850	7,833		34.0%
1860	11,182		42.8%
1870	6,059		−45.8%
1880	9,364		54.5%
1890	11,347		21.2%
1900	14,494		27.7%
1910	17,495		20.7%
1920	22,008		25.8%
1930	25,967		18.0%
1940	28,776		10.8%
1950	27,264		−5.3%
1960	21,837		−19.9%
1970	23,788		8.9%
1980	30,041		26.3%
1990	29,830		−0.7%
2000	31,214		4.6%
2010	30,776		−1.4%
2020	29,341		−4.7%
2025 (est.)	29,097	▼	−0.8%
U.S. Decennial Census; 1790–1960 1900–1990; 1990–2000 2010–2020

=== 2020 census ===
Marion County, Alabama – Racial and ethnic composition Note: the US Census treats Hispanic/Latino as an ethnic category. This table excludes Latinos from the racial categories and assigns them to a separate category. Hispanics/Latinos may be of any race.
Race / Ethnicity (NH = Non-Hispanic)	Pop 2000	Pop 2010	Pop 2020	% 2000	% 2010	% 2020
White alone (NH)	29,387	28,509	26,093	94.15%	92.63%	88.93%
Black or African American alone (NH)	1,131	1,178	1,094	3.62%	3.83%	3.73%
Native American or Alaska Native alone (NH)	90	94	82	0.29%	0.31%	0.28%
Asian alone (NH)	45	53	75	0.14%	0.17%	0.26%
Pacific Islander alone (NH)	4	7	14	0.01%	0.02%	0.05%
Other race alone (NH)	7	24	43	0.02%	0.08%	0.15%
Mixed race or Multiracial (NH)	190	279	1,077	0.61%	0.91%	3.67%
Hispanic or Latino (any race)	360	632	863	1.15%	2.05%	2.94%
Total	31,214	30,776	29,341	100.00%	100.00%	100.00%

As of the 2020 census, the county had a population of 29,341. The median age was 43.8 years. 20.7% of residents were under the age of 18 and 20.8% of residents were 65 years of age or older. For every 100 females there were 97.8 males, and for every 100 females age 18 and over there were 95.4 males age 18 and over.

The racial makeup of the county was 89.7% White, 3.8% Black or African American, 0.4% American Indian and Alaska Native, 0.3% Asian, 0.0% Native Hawaiian and Pacific Islander, 1.4% from some other race, and 4.5% from two or more races. Hispanic or Latino residents of any race comprised 2.9% of the population.

0.0% of residents lived in urban areas, while 100.0% lived in rural areas.

There were 12,228 households in the county, of which 27.8% had children under the age of 18 living with them and 28.9% had a female householder with no spouse or partner present. About 31.0% of all households were made up of individuals and 14.7% had someone living alone who was 65 years of age or older.

There were 14,073 housing units, of which 13.1% were vacant. Among occupied housing units, 70.4% were owner-occupied and 29.6% were renter-occupied. The homeowner vacancy rate was 1.2% and the rental vacancy rate was 7.7%.

=== 2010 census ===
As of the census of 2010, there were 30,776 people, 12,651 households, and 8,676 families living in the county. The population density was 41 people per square mile (16 people/km^{2}). There were 14,737 housing units at an average density of 19 units per square mile (7.3 units/km^{2}). The racial makeup of the county was 93.6% White, 3.8% Black or African American, 0.3% Native American, 0.2% Asian, 0.0% Pacific Islander, 0.9% from other races, and 1.1% from two or more races. 2.1% of the population were Hispanic or Latino of any race. Of the 12,651 households 26.3% had children under the age of 18 living with them, 51.9% were married couples living together, 12.1% had a female householder with no husband present, and 31.4% were non-families. 28.4% of households were one person and 13.1% were one person aged 65 or older. The average household size was 2.36 and the average family size was 2.87.

The age distribution was 21.7% under the age of 18, 7.7% from 18 to 24, 24.0% from 25 to 44, 28.4% from 45 to 64, and 18.3% 65 or older. The median age was 42.8 years. For every 100 females there were 98.8 males. For every 100 females age 18 and over, there were 101.5 males.

The median household income was $32,769 and the median family income was $44,223. Males had a median income of $34,089 versus $24,481 for females. The per capita income for the county was $19,030. About 13.3% of families and 17.8% of the population were below the poverty line, including 28.3% of those under age 18 and 12.7% of those age 65 or over.

=== 2000 census ===
As of the census of 2000, there were 31,214 people, 12,697 households, and 9,040 families living in the county. The population density was 42 people per square mile (16 people/km^{2}). There were 14,416 housing units at an average density of 19 units per square mile (7.3 units/km^{2}). The racial makeup of the county was 94.76% White, 3.3% Black or African American, 0.29% Native American, 0.20% Asian, 0.03% Pacific Islander, 0.39% from other races, and 0.70% from two or more races. 1.15% of the population were Hispanic or Latino of any race.

Of the 12,697 households 30.40% had children under the age of 18 living with them, 58.40% were married couples living together, 9.50% had a female householder with no husband present, and 28.80% were non-families. 26.50% of households were one person and 12.70% were one person aged 65 or older. The average household size was 2.39 and the average family size was 2.87.

The age distribution was 22.50% under the age of 18, 8.20% from 18 to 24, 28.20% from 25 to 44, 25.20% from 45 to 64, and 15.80% 65 or older. The median age was 39 years. For every 100 females there were 98.00 males. For every 100 females age 18 and over, there were 95.20 males.

The median household income was $27,475 and the median family income was $34,359. Males had a median income of $26,913 versus $19,022 for females. The per capita income for the county was $15,321. About 12.00% of families and 15.60% of the population were below the poverty line, including 18.80% of those under age 18 and 20.00% of those age 65 or over.

== Education ==
Two public school systems, Marion County Schools and Winfield City School District, operate in the county. Hamilton is home to a campus of Bevill State Community College.

Marion County School System

- Philips Elementary and High School (Bear Creek)
- Brilliant Elementary School
- Brilliant High School
- Guin Elementary School
- Marion County High School (Guin)
- Hackleburg Elementary and High School
- Hamilton Elementary School
- Hamilton Middle School
- Hamilton High School

Winfield City School System

- Winfield Elementary School
- Winfield Middle School
- Winfield High School

== Events ==
- Jerry Brown Arts Festival - Hamilton (March)
- Neighbor Day - Hackleburg (Last Saturday in April)
- MayFest - Guin (Second Saturday in May)
- CoalFest - Brilliant (Memorial Day)
- Mule Day - Winfield (September)
- Buttahatchee River Fall Fest - Hamilton (October)

== Media ==
=== Newspapers ===
The Court House at Hamilton burned in March 1887. All newspapers before that date were lost in the flames as the Court House was the repository for them. The newspapers that we have record of after the fire are:

- The Marion County Herald - (1885–1890) The first newspaper available for The Marion Herald is April 5, 1887 due to the Court House Fire. The original date of beginning and editors have been lost with the Court House fire, but seems to have been started around April 1885. The Lamar News states that A. A. Wall had been with the Marion Herald before he started The Vernon Courier which was in 1886. No earlier publishers of the paper have been found. The newspaper passed through several hands before closing its doors. Some of the notable editors include W. F. Green, James S. Clements, W. T. Gast, L. J. Clark, and others. The first editors were listed under the name The Herald Publishing Company.
- The Guin Dispatch (1888–1889) The Guin Dispatch was started around November 1888 by James S. Clements. It did not last long - only 13 issues. It closed its doors with the last issue of Feb 23, 1889.
- The Hamilton Times (1890–1893)
- The Hamilton Free Press (1893–1894)
- The Hamilton News Press (1895)
- The Hamilton Appeal (1896)
- The Guin Gazette (1897)
- The Gazette Appeal (1897)
- The Winfield Enterprise (1899–1900)
- The Marion County Democrat (1900–1904)
- The Marion County Republican (1908–1909)
- The Marion County News (1894, 1896 - 1959?)
- New Hope Record (1920)
- The Winfield Journal (1930–1959)
- The Hackleburg Sentinel (1937–1955)
- The Marion County Journal (1975)
- The Guin Gazette (1987)
- The Gazette Appeal (1987)
- The Journal Record (1976–present)

== Transportation ==
=== Major highways ===
- Interstate 22 / U.S. Highway 78 / State Route 4 (unsigned)
- U.S. Highway 43
- U.S. Highway 278
- State Route 13
- State Route 17
- State Route 19
- State Route 44
- State Route 74
- State Route 107
- State Route 118
- State Route 129
- State Route 142
- State Route 171 (unsigned)
- State Route 172
- State Route 187
- State Route 233
- State Route 237
- State Route 241
- State Route 253

=== Rail ===
- BNSF Railway
- Norfolk Southern Railway

=== Air ===
- Marion County-Rankin Fite Airport

== Politics ==
Marion County is a strongly Republican county. The last Democrat to win the county was Bill Clinton in 1996.

United States presidential election results for Marion County, Alabama
Year	Republican		Democratic		Third party(ies)	
Year	No.	%	No.	%	No.	%
1904	635	34.07%	1,224	65.67%	5	0.27%
1908	589	34.65%	1,100	64.71%	11	0.65%
1912	378	22.39%	1,098	65.05%	212	12.56%
1916	807	37.69%	1,325	61.89%	9	0.42%
1920	1,865	43.08%	2,461	56.85%	3	0.07%
1924	0	0.00%	1,359	99.05%	13	0.95%
1928	1,488	49.13%	1,541	50.87%	0	0.00%
1932	545	18.71%	2,325	79.81%	43	1.48%
1936	911	25.24%	2,655	73.57%	43	1.19%
1940	1,081	28.37%	2,654	69.64%	76	1.99%
1944	1,260	40.17%	1,866	59.48%	11	0.35%
1948	813	32.84%	0	0.00%	1,663	67.16%
1952	1,489	34.25%	2,850	65.55%	9	0.21%
1956	2,536	46.88%	2,849	52.67%	24	0.44%
1960	2,938	48.53%	3,099	51.19%	17	0.28%
1964	3,966	69.42%	0	0.00%	1,747	30.58%
1968	1,492	17.76%	365	4.34%	6,546	77.90%
1972	5,927	85.38%	986	14.20%	29	0.42%
1976	3,036	32.63%	6,244	67.12%	23	0.25%
1980	5,182	48.26%	5,450	50.75%	106	0.99%
1984	6,771	63.20%	3,918	36.57%	24	0.22%
1988	5,955	56.73%	4,505	42.92%	37	0.35%
1992	5,692	42.89%	6,167	46.47%	1,411	10.63%
1996	4,742	43.79%	5,049	46.62%	1,039	9.59%
2000	6,910	58.78%	4,600	39.13%	246	2.09%
2004	8,983	69.77%	3,808	29.58%	84	0.65%
2008	9,536	77.18%	2,600	21.04%	219	1.77%
2012	9,697	79.95%	2,249	18.54%	183	1.51%
2016	11,274	86.83%	1,432	11.03%	278	2.14%
2020	12,205	88.40%	1,463	10.60%	139	1.01%
2024	12,245	90.42%	1,197	8.84%	101	0.75%

United States Senate election results for Marion County, Alabama2
Year	Republican		Democratic		Third party(ies)	
Year	No.	%	No.	%	No.	%
2020	11,897	86.46%	1,847	13.42%	16	0.12%

United States Senate election results for Marion County, Alabama3
Year	Republican		Democratic		Third party(ies)	
Year	No.	%	No.	%	No.	%
2022	7,636	91.15%	591	7.06%	150	1.79%

Alabama Gubernatorial election results for Marion County
Year	Republican		Democratic		Third party(ies)	
Year	No.	%	No.	%	No.	%
2022	7,625	90.68%	528	6.28%	256	3.04%

== Communities ==
=== Cities ===
- Guin
- Haleyville (mostly in Winston County)
- Hamilton (county seat)
- Winfield (partly in Fayette County)

=== Towns ===
- Bear Creek
- Brilliant
- Glen Allen (partly in Fayette County)
- Gu-Win (partly in Fayette County)
- Hackleburg
- Twin

=== Unincorporated communities ===
- Barnesville
- Bexar
- Byrd
- Pigeye
- Pull Tight
- Shottsville
- South Haleyville
- Texas

=== Ghost town ===
- Pikeville

== See also ==
- National Register of Historic Places listings in Marion County, Alabama
- Properties on the Alabama Register of Landmarks and Heritage in Marion County, Alabama
