= Quinton, Alabama =

- Unincorporated community
- Location within Alabama Location within the United States
- Coordinates: 33°40′19″N 87°04′00″W
- Country: United States
- State: Alabama
- County: Walker
- Elevation: 436 ft (133 m)
- Time zone: UTC-6 (Central (CST))
  - Summer (DST): UTC-5 (CDT)
- ZIP code: 35130
- Area codes: 205, 659
- GNIS feature ID: 125388

Quinton is an unincorporated community in Walker County, Alabama, United States, located 4.2 miles (6.8 km) south-southeast of Dora. Quinton has a post office with ZIP code 35130, which opened on March 27, 1888.
