= Brilliant, Alabama =

- Town
- Seal

- Location in Marion County, Alabama
- Coordinates: 34°01′31″N 87°46′08″W
- Country: United States
- State: Alabama
- County: Marion

Area
  - Total: 10.59 sq mi (27.4 km^{2})
  - Land: 10.59 sq mi (27.4 km^{2})
  - Water: 0.00 sq mi (0 km^{2})
- Elevation: 640 ft (200 m)

Population (2020)
  - Total: 845
  - Density: 79.78/sq mi (30.80/km^{2})
- Time zone: UTC-6 (Central (CST))
  - Summer (DST): UTC-5 (CDT)
- ZIP code: 35548
- Area codes: 205, 659
- FIPS code: 01-09424
- GNIS feature ID: 2405321
- Website: www.brilliantal.org

Brilliant is a town in Marion County, Alabama, United States. At the 2020 census the population was 845.

== History ==
In the late part of the 19th century, the discovery of coal led to the development of the Aldridge Mining Company in 1897 (later, in 1906, named the Brilliant Coal Company), which was located adjacent to the town. The Brilliant Coal Company served as a catalyst for growth for the area and provided ample employment for more than 50 years.

The towns of Brilliant and Boston were so closely associated that no attempt was made to separate their history. Eventually, in 1957, with the passage of Act 284 by the Alabama Legislature, Boston was incorporated into the town of Brilliant, and the name "Boston" was dropped. Boston had originally taken its name in honor of Jimmy L. Bostick, one of the first settlers of the town. The name "Brilliant" is derived from the glossy sheen found on the type of high-grade coal that was mined near the town, before the demise of the Brilliant Coal Company in 1953. The coal was said to burn so brilliantly, due to its composition of only 2% ash, 1% sulfur and no clinker.

At the turn of the 20th century, the Brilliant and Boston area was the most densely populated part of Marion County.

By the end of the 1950s the Brilliant Coal Company had shuttered its mining operations; however, several smaller mining operations were in business around the area until the early 1990s.

From 1987 until 2000 the town was home to Brilliant Homes Ltd., a manufacturer of mobile homes. The company was acquired by American Homestar Corporation of League City, Texas, in 1997. The plant was closed on April 15, 2000, due to declining sales throughout the manufactured housing industry. American Homestar Corporation subsequently filed for Chapter 11 bankruptcy later in 2001.

Employers in the town include a garment manufacturing plant, Tullahoma Industries, which produces garments for the U.S. Army, and Stone Canyon Cabins, which manufactures park model cabins at the site of the old Brilliant Homes plant.

The following is from an August 30, 1957, Winfield Journal article: Boston is Now Brilliant; Act Also Extends Corporate Limits

"It's official now. The municipality of Boston is no more. As of August 16, Governor James E. Folsom signed into law Act No. 284 which changed the name of the town from Boston to Brilliant and extended the boundary lines to take in approximately 40 more homes and bring the town's population to about 1,000 residents. Mayor Max A. Wood made the announcement earlier this week.

In a straw vote election held on last April 23, 1956 citizens voted 120 for to 37 against to change the name of the town and extend the city limits.
For many years only a part of the Boston-Brilliant community has been incorporated. Boston was incorporated while the area consisting of Brilliant was not.
The town of Boston had its origins sometime in the latter part of the 19th century. Alfred Wates opened the first store and later as the community grew, an early settler named Lee Beauchamp named it Boston for the city of Boston, Massachusetts, and also because the name tied in somewhat with the pioneer Bostick family who settled in the area about the time of the Civil War. Both Boston and Brilliant owe most of their early development and progress to the mines of the Aldredge and Brilliant Coal Companies. Brilliant began with the opening of coal mines around 1897.

Mayor Wood said that the increase in population resulting from the extension of the corporate limits would mean more revenue from state sources as well as other advantages."

== Geography ==
Brilliant is located in southeastern Marion County and is bordered to the south by the city of Winfield and to the west by Guin. Interstate 22 passes through the southern part of the town, with access from Exit 30 (State Route 129) and Exit 26 (State Route 44). Hamilton, the Marion county seat, is 18 miles (29 km) to the northwest.

According to the U.S. Census Bureau, the town of Brilliant has a total area of 10.6 square miles (27 km^{2}), all of it recorded as land. The town is drained by Bostick Creek and Little Clifty Creek, southeast-flowing tributaries of the Little New River, one of the headwaters of the Sipsey River and part of the Tombigbee River watershed.

== Demographics ==
Historical population
Census	Pop.	Note	%±
1930	522		—
1940	591		13.2%
1950	700		18.4%
1960	749		7.0%
1970	726		−3.1%
1980	871		20.0%
1990	751		−13.8%
2000	762		1.5%
2010	900		18.1%
2020	845		−6.1%
U.S. Decennial Census; 2013 Estimate

As of the census of 2000, there were 762 people, 343 households, and 220 families residing in the town. The population density was 221.7 inhabitants per square mile (85.6/km^{2}). There were 402 housing units at an average density of 116.9 per square mile (45.1/km^{2}). The racial makeup of the town was 99.61% White, 0.13% Native American, and 0.26% from two or more races. 0.66% of the population were Hispanic or Latino of any race.

There were 343 households, out of which 27.7% had children under the age of 18 living with them, 48.7% were married couples living together, 12.2% had a female householder with no husband present, and 35.6% were non-families. 34.1% of all households were made up of individuals, and 16.0% had someone living alone who was 65 years of age or older. The average household size was 2.22 and the average family size was 2.81.

In the town, the population was spread out, with 22.7% under the age of 18, 7.2% from 18 to 24, 25.1% from 25 to 44, 25.5% from 45 to 64, and 19.6% who were 65 years of age or older. The median age was 41 years. For every 100 females, there were 91.5 males. For every 100 females age 18 and over, there were 85.8 males.

The median income for a household in the town was $18,224, and the median income for a family was $27,857. Males had a median income of $28,611 versus $15,703 for females. The per capita income for the town was $14,516. About 22.4% of families and 26.5% of the population were below the poverty line, including 37.3% of those under age 18 and 27.0% of those age 65 or over.

== Transportation ==
=== Major highways ===
- Interstate 22
- State Route 44
- State Route 129
