= Area codes 205 and 659 =

Telephone area code in Alabama, US

Coordinates: 33°34′N 87°18′W

Map of number plan area 205/659 (red) in Alabama

Area codes 205 and 659 are telephone area codes in the North American Numbering Plan (NANP) for the western and central parts of the U.S. state of Alabama, including the cities of Birmingham and Tuscaloosa.

Area code 205 was one of the original North American area codes created in 1947 when AT&T created the first continental telephone numbering plan. The numbering plan area comprised the entire state, making Alabama one of 34 states served by a single area code. By the 1990s, 205 was nearing exhaustion of central office prefixes due to the state's growth and the proliferation of cell phones and pagers. In 1995, area code 334 was created to serve the area from Montgomery southward, reducing the geographic extent of 205. The numbering plan area was further reduced in 1998, when the northern and eastern portions were assigned area code 256.

In October 2019, area code 659 was added as a second area code to the 205 numbering plan area, creating as an overlay plan for the region. This change mandated ten-digit dialing for all calls.

== Service area ==
Counties:

- Bibb (most; part of Bibb County is in area code 334)
- Blount
- Chilton (most; part of Chilton County is in area code 334)
- Choctaw
- Etowah (part; most of Etowah County is in area code 256/area code 938)
- Fayette
- Franklin (part; most of Franklin County is in area code 256/area code 938)
- Greene
- Hale
- Jefferson
- Lamar
- Marion
- Perry
- Pickens
- St. Clair
- Shelby
- Sumter
- Tuscaloosa
- Walker
- Winston

Cities and towns:

- Alabaster
- Argo
- Birmingham
- Bessemer
- Brent
- Brilliant
- Butler
- Calera
- Carbon Hill
- Centreville
- Center Point
- Chelsea
- Clanton
- Columbiana
- Dora
- Double Springs
- Eutaw
- Fairfield
- Fayette
- Fultondale
- Gardendale
- Gilbertown
- Greensboro
- Guin
- Haleyville
- Hamilton
- Hayden
- Helena
- Homewood
- Hoover
- Hueytown
- Irondale
- Jasper
- Jemison
- Leeds
- Lisman
- Livingston
- Montevallo
- Moody
- Moundville
- Mountain Brook
- Needham
- Northport
- Oneonta
- Pelham
- Pell City
- Pennington
- Pleasant Grove
- Silas
- Sumiton
- Trussville
- Tuscaloosa
- Vernon
- Vestavia Hills
- Vincent
- Warrior
- Winfield
- York

== See also ==
- List of Alabama area codes
- List of NANP area codes

Alabama area codes: 205/659, 251, 256/938, 334
	North: 256/938	
West: 601/769, 662	205/659	East: 256/938
	South: 251, 334/483	
Mississippi area codes: 228, 601/769, 471/662
