= Carbon Hill, Alabama =

City in Alabama, United States

- City
- City of Carbon Hill
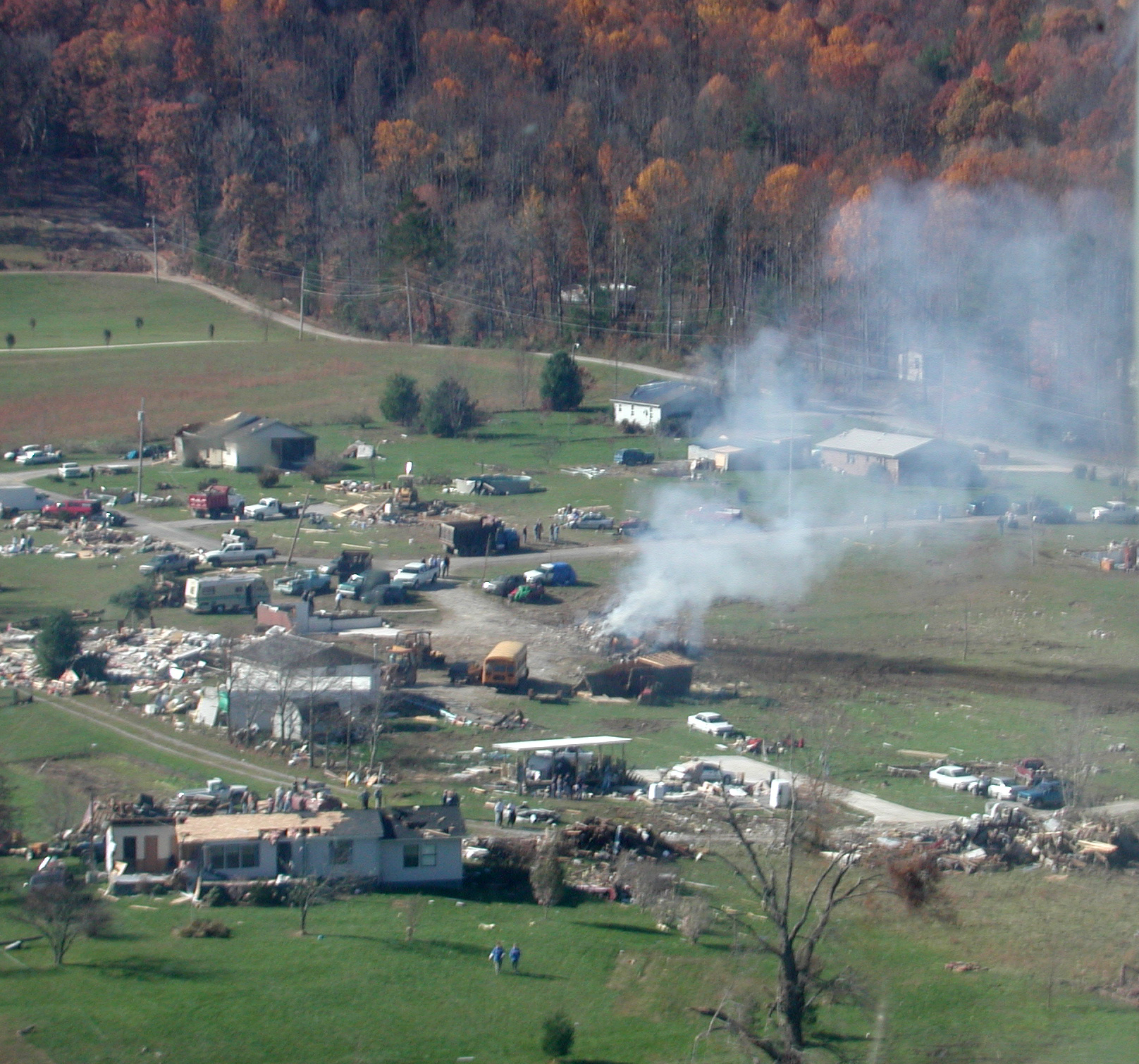
- Carbon Hill, tornado damage on November 14, 2002.

- Location of Carbon Hill in Walker County, Alabama.
- Coordinates: 33°52′46″N 87°30′22″W
- Country: United States
- State: Alabama
- County: Walker

Area
  - Total: 5.59 sq mi (14.47 km^{2})
  - Land: 5.51 sq mi (14.27 km^{2})
  - Water: 0.073 sq mi (0.19 km^{2})
- Elevation: 522 ft (159 m)

Population (2020)
  - Total: 1,769
  - Density: 321.0/sq mi (123.95/km^{2})
- Time zone: UTC-6 (Central (CST))
  - Summer (DST): UTC-5 (CDT)
- ZIP code: 35549
- Area codes: 205, 659
- FIPS code: 01-12016
- GNIS feature ID: 2403992
- Website: carbonhill.org

Carbon Hill is a city in Walker County, Alabama, United States. It incorporated in February 1891. As of the 2020 census, Carbon Hill had a population of 1,769.

== History ==
Carbon Hill, Alabama, was settled in 1886 because of coal mining and the railroad. A post office was established in 1887 with John T. Anderson as the first Postmaster. By 1888, the community had grown enough to support the Carbon Hill United Methodist Church.

The Galloway Coal Company was responsible for the early development of Carbon Hill. Col. Robert Galloway entered the coal and transfer business in 1863. On May 1, 1890, Galloway bought mines and property on Carbon Hill (as it was then called) from The Kansas City Coal and Coke Company for $130,000. Galloway turned the operation into a commercial success. Other mining companies set up operations after word spread of Galloway's success.

On February 1, 1891, the Sheriff of Walker County telegraphed the governor of Alabama requesting fifty soldiers to be dispatched to Carbon Hill. Mayor Anderson wired: "There is a lawless mob here. Colored people are shot and driven from home. No arrest made. We need troops." Superintendent B. W. Whitfield of the Carbon Hill Coal and Coke Company was anxious to fire 200 striking miners, and the men had caught word of it. The strikers feared the black citizens would take their jobs.

On February 14, 1891, the town of Carbon Hill was incorporated, with John T. Anderson as mayor. February 14 is also known as St. Valentine's Day; the founding fathers wanted the tiny town to be known as The Village of Love and Luck. The notion of coal as luck derives from the cultural traditions of Scotland (where Colonel Galloway was born) - it is also customary and considered lucky in Scotland and the North of England to give coal as a gift on New Year's Day. This occurs as part of First-Footing and represents warmth for the year to come.

On May 27, 1917, an F3 tornado hit Carbon Hill, killing 6 people and destroying 200 homes in an area 3 miles wide by 17 miles long.

Carbon Hill was "especially hard-hit by the Depression," and became known for its "savvy utilization of federal resources" provided by the Works Progress Administration (WPA) and the Public Works Administration (PWA). Residents used the funding to build a new high school, and made improvements to sewers, sidewalks, and streets.

On November 17, 1957, an F4 (max. wind speeds 207-260 mph) tornado 13.2 miles away from the Carbon Hill city center killed 4 people and injured 15 people.

An F3 tornado destroyed much of Carbon Hill on November 10, 2002.

An EF1 (max speeds 86-110 mph) tornado quickly passed through Carbon Hill on April 12, 2020, part of the 2020 Easter tornado outbreak. It remain on the ground for four minutes, traveling in a northeasterly direction and was 1,000 yards at its widest point. The tornado remained on the ground for 2.9 miles uprooting and snapping tree, destroying homes and other structures. This tornado was one of four that struck the Walker County on same day. No deaths or severe injuries were reported.

=== Mark Chambers controversies ===
Mark Chambers was appointed to the mayoralty in 2014. He won a full mayoral term in 2016. On June 5, 2019, Chambers made national news when local news outlet WBRC reported that Chambers made three public posts on Facebook with derogatory and threatening statements aimed at members of the LGBT community, including:

We live in a society where homosexuals lecture us on morals, transvestites lecture us on human biology, baby killers lecture us on human rights and socialists lecture us on economics. The only way to change it would be to kill the problem out. I know it’s bad to say but without killing them out there’s no way to fix it.

He also called immigrants "ungrateful" and initially denied writing the inflammatory social media post to a reporter.

Chambers later apologized for the posts, which were deleted, and in an interview with a local newspaper revealed having no intention to resign.

Following social media posts on June 25, 2020, by the Alabama Crimson Tide football team supportive of the Black Lives Matter movement, Chambers commented on Facebook, "I got several Alabama pictures for sale Nick Sabin (sic) and the Tide is done in my opinion... Their sorry ass political views is why their (sic) getting out of my house... When you put Black lives before all lives they can kiss my ass." By June 28, Chambers's comments had been deleted. He subsequently resigned, and was replaced by councilwoman April Kennedy Herron.

== Geography ==
Carbon Hill was begun as a small mining town in extreme western Walker County.

According to the U.S. Census Bureau, the city has a total area of 5.6 square miles (15 km^{2}), of which 5.5 square miles (14 km^{2}) is land and 0.1 square miles (0.26 km^{2}) (0.90%) is water.

=== Climate ===
The climate in this area is characterized by hot, humid summers and generally mild to cool winters. According to the Köppen Climate Classification system, Carbon Hill has a humid subtropical climate, abbreviated "Cfa" on climate maps.

== Government ==
Carbon Hill has a six-member city council that is elected by geographic districts.

== Demographics ==
Historical population
Census	Pop.	Note	%±
1890	568		—
1900	830		46.1%
1910	1,627		96.0%
1920	2,666		63.9%
1930	2,519		−5.5%
1940	2,555		1.4%
1950	2,179		−14.7%
1960	1,944		−10.8%
1970	1,929		−0.8%
1980	2,452		27.1%
1990	2,115		−13.7%
2000	2,071		−2.1%
2010	2,021		−2.4%
2020	1,769		−12.5%
U.S. Decennial Census; 2013 Estimate

=== Racial and ethnic composition ===
Carbon Hill city, Alabama – Racial and ethnic composition Note: the US Census treats Hispanic/Latino as an ethnic category. This table excludes Latinos from the racial categories and assigns them to a separate category. Hispanics/Latinos may be of any race. Race and ethnicity were not surveyed for populations under 2,500 in 1980 and under 1,000 in 1990.
Race / Ethnicity (NH = Non-Hispanic)	Pop 1990	Pop 2000	Pop 2010	Pop 2020	% 1990	% 2000	% 2010	% 2020
White alone (NH)	1,904	1,843	1,802	1,517	90.02%	88.99%	89.16%	85.75%
Black or African American alone (NH)	192	176	161	113	9.08%	8.50%	7.97%	6.39%
Native American or Alaska Native alone (NH)	1	2	3	1	0.05%	0.10%	0.15%	0.06%
Asian alone (NH)	3	0	2	3	0.14%	0.00%	0.10%	0.17%
Native Hawaiian or Pacific Islander alone (NH)	x	0	0	0	x	0.00%	0.00%	0.00%
Other race alone (NH)	0	0	1	4	0.00%	0.00%	0.05%	0.23%
Mixed race or Multiracial (NH)	x	29	28	92	x	1.40%	1.39%	5.20%
Hispanic or Latino (any race)	15	21	24	39	0.71%	1.01%	1.19%	2.20%
Total	2,115	2,071	2,021	1,769	100.00%	100.00%	100.00%	100.00%

=== 2020 census ===
As of the 2020 census, Carbon Hill had a population of 1,769. The median age was 47.4 years. 19.1% of residents were under the age of 18 and 25.6% of residents were 65 years of age or older. For every 100 females there were 84.3 males, and for every 100 females age 18 and over there were 79.7 males age 18 and over.

0.0% of residents lived in urban areas, while 100.0% lived in rural areas.

There were 752 households in Carbon Hill, of which 26.3% had children under the age of 18 living in them. 34.0% were married-couple households, 23.9% were households with a male householder and no spouse or partner present, and 36.0% were households with a female householder and no spouse or partner present. About 38.3% of all households were made up of individuals and 15.8% had someone living alone who was 65 years of age or older; 364 households were families.

There were 884 housing units, of which 14.9% were vacant. The homeowner vacancy rate was 3.3% and the rental vacancy rate was 8.3%.

=== 2010 census ===
At the 2010 census there were 2,021 people in 860 households, including 550 families, in the city. The population density was 367.5 inhabitants per square mile (141.9/km^{2}). There were 995 housing units at an average density of 180.9 per square mile (69.8/km^{2}). The racial makeup of the city was 89.4% White, 8.2% Black or African American, 0.2% Native American, 0.6% from other races, and 1.2% from two or more races. 1.2% of the population were Hispanic or Latino of any race. Of the 860 households 25.7% had children under the age of 18 living with them, 41.4% were married couples living together, 17.0% had a female householder with no husband present, and 36.0% were non-families. 33.8% of households were one person and 15.8% were one person aged 65 or older. The average household size was 2.35 and the average family size was 2.97.

The age distribution was 23.7% under the age of 18, 7.4% from 18 to 24, 25.2% from 25 to 44, 26.4% from 45 to 64, and 17.3% 65 or older. The median age was 40.9 years. For every 100 females, there were 90.3 males. For every 100 females age 18 and over, there were 90.6 males.

The median household income was $25,481 and the median family income was $36,298. Males had a median income of $32,455 versus $25,417 for females. The per capita income for the city was $15,167. About 24.6% of families and 26.2% of the population were below the poverty line, including 44.0% of those under age 18 and 27.9% of those age 65 or over.

=== 2000 census ===
At the 2000 census there were 2,071 people in 880 households, including 579 families, in the city. The population density was 374.3 inhabitants per square mile (144.5/km^{2}). There were 1,017 housing units at an average density of 183.8 per square mile (71.0/km^{2}). The racial makeup of the city was 89.43% White, 8.74% Black or African American, 0.10% Native American, 0.29% from other races, and 1.45% from two or more races. 1.01% of the population were Hispanic or Latino of any race. Of the 880 households 28.3% had children under the age of 18 living with them, 46.3% were married couples living together, 15.1% had a female householder with no husband present, and 34.2% were non-families. 31.9% of households were one person and 14.4% were one person aged 65 or older. The average household size was 2.28 and the average family size was 2.85.

The age distribution was 22.2% under the age of 18, 8.3% from 18 to 24, 24.2% from 25 to 44, 27.0% from 45 to 64, and 18.3% 65 or older. The median age was 41 years. For every 100 females, there were 81.7 males. For every 100 females age 18 and over, there were 77.1 males. The median household income was $20,861 and the median family income was $25,556. Males had a median income of $23,241 versus $15,170 for females. The per capita income for the city was $12,100. About 23.0% of families and 24.0% of the population were below the poverty line, including 30.7% of those under age 18 and 20.5% of those age 65 or over.

== Notable people ==
- Lloyd Cheatham, Football player Carbon Hill High School 1935 to 1939
- Ken Guin, Member of Alabama House of Representatives from 1994 to 2010
- Buddy Nix, Buffalo Bills General Manager from 2010 to 2013
- Joseph Sam Perry, federal judge on the United States District Court for the Northern District of Illinois
- Wimp Sanderson, basketball coach at Carbon Hill High School
- Elmer Tutwiler, baseball player for the Pittsburgh Pirates

== Education ==
This town is served by Carbon Hill High School, a facility of 430 students in grades 9-12. The school is known as the first place of employment for college basketball coach "Wimp" Sanderson, and home to many collegiate football players. The school's mascot is the Bulldog, and the colors are blue and white. The school is a member of the Walker County Board of Education. In 2002, the original school building was destroyed by fire. It was recently replaced by a new building. Carbon Hill Elementary/Junior High School which some of the students were temporarily relocated was destroyed by an F3 tornado that destroyed much of Carbon Hill on November 10, 2002.
