= Winfield, Alabama =

City in Alabama, United States

Winfield
- City
- Seal

- Location in Fayette and Marion counties, Alabama
- Coordinates: 33°56′00″N 87°47′40″W
- Country: United States
- State: Alabama
- Counties: Marion, Fayette
- Named for: Winfield Scott

Area
  - Total: 17.83 sq mi (46.2 km^{2})
  - Land: 17.78 sq mi (46.0 km^{2})
  - Water: 0.05 sq mi (0.13 km^{2})
- Elevation: 554 ft (169 m)

Population (2020)
  - Total: 4,845
  - Density: 272.47/sq mi (105.20/km^{2})
- Time zone: UTC-6 (Central (CST))
  - Summer (DST): UTC-5 (CDT)
- ZIP code: 35594
- Area codes: 205, 659
- FIPS code: 01-82992
- GNIS feature ID: 2405765
- Website: www.winfieldcity.org

Winfield is a city in Marion and Fayette counties in the U.S. state of Alabama. The population was 4,845 at the 2020 census, the second largest city in Marion County.

== History ==
Winfield is a small city situated in northwest Alabama, 26 miles (42 km) east of the Mississippi state line. It lies in the foothills of the Appalachian Mountain range which stretches from the deep South all the way to Canada. Long before the earliest settlers arrived, Native Americans hunted in the forest and fished in the streams of the region. This area was once the domain of the Chickasaw people. Although there were no known Native American settlements within the county, several sites were maintained as hunting camps.

The site was originally known simply as Luxapallila, after the adjacent creek. Later, when settlers began to arrive in greater force, they called their community "Needmore". When it was incorporated in either 1887 or 1891, the name was changed to "Winfield" in honor of General Winfield Scott.

At the end of 2014, a secret meeting by the city council of Winfield, and by unanimous vote, symbolically declared God the owner of the city of Winfield.

== Geography and climate ==
=== Geography ===
Winfield is located in southern Marion County with a portion extending south into Fayette County. U.S. Route 43 passes through the city, leading northwest 6.5 miles (10.5 km) to Guin and south 18 miles (29 km) to Fayette. Hamilton, the Marion County seat, is 20 miles (32 km) northwest via US 43.

According to the U.S. Census Bureau, the city has a total area of 17.9 square miles (46 km^{2}), of which 0.04 square miles (0.1036 km^{2}), or 0.27%, are water. The East Branch of Luxapallila Creek curves past the center of town, flowing southwest toward the Tombigbee River at Columbus, Mississippi.

=== Climate ===
Winfield has a subtropical climate characterized by hot, humid summers, mild winters, and abundant rainfall during the late winter and spring. January sees average daily high temperatures of 53.0 °F (11.7 °C) and lows of 31.8 °F (−0.1 °C). In July, the average daily high is 90.6 °F (32.6 °C), and the low is 69.2 °F (20.7 °C). Snowfall is infrequent in the area, with a yearly average of 0.5 inches (12.7 mm). The average yearly rainfall in Winfield is about 52 inches (1,300 mm), with March being the wettest month and October the driest.

The spring and fall months are pleasant but variable, but cold fronts frequently bring strong to severe thunderstorms and occasional tornadoes to the region. The fall season features less rainfall and fewer storms, as well as lower humidity than the spring, but is also a secondary severe weather season.

=== December 2021 tornado ===
Late in the evening hours of December 29, 2021, a line of strong to severe storms entered Alabama from Mississippi. At 6:27 PM, a tornado warning was issued for an area that included Winfield, Guin, Brilliant, Glen Allen, Beaverton, Gu-Win, Crews, Tucker, Bazemore, and Texas. The storm caused damage on the outskirts of Winfield in the form of downed trees. At 6:46 PM, the tornado moved over downtown Winfield, causing a substantial amount of damage in the area. No injuries or fatalities were reported despite eight workers at a local pizza bar being trapped for about 30 minutes. The tornado was rated EF-1.

== Demographics ==
Historical population
Census	Pop.	Note	%±
1900	316		—
1910	419		32.6%
1920	753		79.7%
1930	1,254		66.5%
1940	1,662		32.5%
1950	2,108		26.8%
1960	2,907		37.9%
1970	3,292		13.2%
1980	3,781		14.9%
1990	3,689		−2.4%
2000	4,540		23.1%
2010	4,717		3.9%
2020	4,845		2.7%
U.S. Decennial Census; 2013 Estimate

=== 2020 census ===
As of the 2020 census, Winfield had a population of 4,845. The median age was 45.0 years. 20.6% of residents were under the age of 18 and 21.8% of residents were 65 years of age or older. For every 100 females there were 90.1 males, and for every 100 females age 18 and over there were 85.9 males age 18 and over.

0.0% of residents lived in urban areas, while 100.0% lived in rural areas.

Of the 1,993 households in Winfield, 1,242 were family households and 29.9% had children under the age of 18 living in them. Of all households, 47.9% were married-couple households, 16.3% were households with a male householder and no spouse or partner present, and 30.6% were households with a female householder and no spouse or partner present. About 29.4% of all households were made up of individuals and 14.5% had someone living alone who was 65 years of age or older.

There were 2,207 housing units, of which 9.7% were vacant. The homeowner vacancy rate was 0.8% and the rental vacancy rate was 7.6%.

Winfield racial composition
Race	Num.	Perc.
White (non-Hispanic)	4,223	87.16%
Black or African American (non-Hispanic)	275	5.68%
Native American	8	0.17%
Asian	15	0.31%
Pacific Islander	3	0.06%
Other/Mixed	184	3.8%
Hispanic or Latino	137	2.83%

=== 2010 census ===
At the 2010 census there were 4,717 people. The population density was 291.2 inhabitants per square mile (112.4/km^{2}). There were 2,289 housing units at an average density of 141.3 per square mile (54.6/km^{2}). The racial makeup of the city was 92.9% White, 4.5% Black or African American, 0.3% Native American, 0.3% Asian, 0.9% from other races, and 1.0% from two or more races. 2.0% of the population were Hispanic or Latino of any race. Of the 1,984 households 26.1% had children under the age of 18 living with them, 49.0% were married couples living together, 13.5% had a female householder with no husband present, and 33.8% were non-families. 30.6% of households were one person and 15.1% were one person aged 65 or older. The average household size was 2.31 and the average family size was 2.86.

The age distribution was 21.3% under the age of 18, 7.8% from 18 to 24, 23.2% from 25 to 44, 27.5% from 45 to 64, and 20.2% 65 or older. The median age was 43.2 years. For every 100 females, there were 91.1 males. For every 100 females age 18 and over, there were 90.5 males.

The median household income was $34,617 and the median family income was $43,692. Males had a median income of $38,250 versus $32,250 for females. The per capita income for the city was $19,386. About 16.4% of families and 18.6% of the population were below the poverty line, including 21.1% of those under age 18 and 24.4% of those age 65 or over.

=== 2000 census ===
At the 2000 census there were 4,540 people. The population density was 279.9 inhabitants per square mile (108.1/km^{2}). There were 2,126 housing units at an average density of 131.1 per square mile (50.6/km^{2}). The racial makeup of the city was 94.56% White, 4.21% Black or African American, 0.20% Native American, 0.22% Asian, 0.20% from other races, and 0.62% from two or more races. 1.19% of the population were Hispanic or Latino of any race. Of the 1,849 households 30.7% had children under the age of 18 living with them, 57.4% were married couples living together, 10.7% had a female householder with no husband present, and 29.1% were non-families. 27.7% of households were one person and 15.0% were one person aged 65 or older. The average household size was 2.38 and the average family size was 2.89.

The age distribution was 23.3% under the age of 18, 7.4% from 18 to 24, 26.7% from 25 to 44, 22.6% from 45 to 64, and 20.0% 65 or older. The median age was 40 years. For every 100 females, there were 87.5 males. For every 100 females age 18 and over, there were 82.0 males.

The median household income was $31,317 and the median family income was $38,545. Males had a median income of $32,734 versus $21,184 for females. The per capita income for the city was $15,814. About 11.1% of families and 14.1% of the population were below the poverty line, including 17.6% of those under age 18 and 11.5% of those age 65 or over.

== Culture ==
=== Festivals ===
Mule Day is hosted on the fourth Saturday in September each year, and has been termed "One of the top 20 events in the Southeast" by Travel and Tourism magazine. The keynote event is a horse parade through the downtown of the city, but there is also live entertainment, car shows and a diverse venue of homemade baked goods sold in a farmers market setting. One of the most popular events amongst most elementary and middle schoolers is the Mule Day carnival. The small carnival area is usually located along Kirkwood St. between U.S. Route 43 and Midway Dr., a distance of about 460 ft.). Others are small shops and games where food is sold (Vendor booths and food stands are set up throughout the town and are not part of the "carnival"). Celebrated since 1975, Mule Day has grown into a major event not only for the City of Winfield but also for the State of Alabama.

=== The Pastime Theater ===
The Pastime Theater is a historical theater built in 1937 and recently renovated for use as a performing arts center. This facility offers cultural events which benefit Winfield and outlying communities.

== Organizations ==
The Traditional Confederate Knights are headquartered in Winfield. A division of the Ku Klux Klan, the organization was listed as a hate group in a 2016 document by the Southern Poverty Law Center.

== Notable people ==
- Trey Cunningham, hurdler
- W. Eugene Davis, judge of the United States Court of Appeals for the Fifth Circuit
- Jimmy Miles, award-winning country musician
- Johnny Micheal Spann, an operative of the Central Intelligence Agency (CIA)
- The Dirty Clergy, a national garage rock/pop band
