= Guin, Alabama =

City in Alabama, United States

- City
- Flag
- Nickname: "Proud home of Scufflegrit”
- Motto(s): "Come experience the charm and friendliness of the Deep South"
- Location of Guin in Marion County, Alabama.
- Coordinates: 34°01′12″N 87°52′50″W
- Country: United States
- State: Alabama
- County: Marion
- Established: 1889

Area
  - Total: 14.97 sq mi (38.8 km^{2})
  - Land: 14.97 sq mi (38.8 km^{2})
  - Water: 0.00 sq mi (0 km^{2})
- Elevation: 558 ft (170 m)

Population (2020)
  - Total: 2,195
  - Density: 146.58/sq mi (56.59/km^{2})
- Time zone: UTC-6 (Central (CST))
  - Summer (DST): UTC-5 (CDT)
- ZIP code: 35563
- Area codes: 205, 659
- FIPS code: 01-32224
- GNIS feature ID: 2403768
- Website: www.guinal.org

Guin /ˈɡjuːɪn/ is a city in Marion County, Alabama, United States. It incorporated in December 1889. At the 2020 census, the population was 2,195.

== History ==
Guin takes its name from a young country doctor, Dr. Jeremiah ("Jerry") Guin from Tuscaloosa County, who purchased the farm known then as Haley's Trading Post (where is now situate the town of Guin) from a certain John T. Meador in 1870, and who, in turn, had bought the property from a certain Alan Haley, a newcomer to the State, who had built there a country store on the most used road stretching from north to south, in order to accommodate cattle drovers taking their cattle to market in Columbus and Aberdeen, Mississippi. Jeremiah Guin, while looking for a place to make his home, moved the center of interest about a mile east of Haley's Trading Post (now 12th Street N. and 11 Ave. in present-day Guin).

In the early years of its settlement, a saw mill was built and operated in the town, known originally as Kenney Lumber Company (and later known as Brown Lumber Co.), supplying cut timber to the local community.

On April 3, 1974, Guin was devastated by a fast moving F5 tornado during the 1974 Super Outbreak, the second-largest tornado outbreak on record. That storm took twenty-three lives.

On July 13, 2010, the citizens of Guin voted to become the first city in Marion County since Prohibition to allow the sale of alcohol.

== Geography ==
Guin is located in southern Marion County. U.S. Routes 43 and 278 meet in the center of town, leaving it together to the north, while US 43 leads southeast from the city and US 278 leads southwest. Hamilton, the county seat, is 13 miles (21 km) to the north, Winfield is 6 miles (10 km) to the southeast, and Sulligent is 14 miles (23 km) to the southwest.

According to the U.S. Census Bureau, the city of Guin has a total area of 15.0 square miles (39 km^{2}), all land. Purgatory Creek runs through the southern part of the city, leading west to Beaver Creek, which continues west to the Buttahatchee River, part of the Tombigbee River watershed.

== Demographics ==
Historical population
Census	Pop.	Note	%±
1900	249		—
1910	356		43.0%
1920	596		67.4%
1930	1,099		84.4%
1940	1,175		6.9%
1950	1,137		−3.2%
1960	1,462		28.6%
1970	2,220		51.8%
1980	2,418		8.9%
1990	2,464		1.9%
2000	2,389		−3.0%
2010	2,376		−0.5%
2020	2,195		−7.6%
U.S. Decennial Census; 2013 Estimate

=== Racial and ethnic composition ===
Guin city, Alabama – Racial and ethnic composition Note: the US Census treats Hispanic/Latino as an ethnic category. This table excludes Latinos from the racial categories and assigns them to a separate category. Hispanics/Latinos may be of any race. Race and ethnicity were not reported in Alabama for populations under 2,500 in 1980 and under 1,000 in 1990.
Race / Ethnicity (NH = Non-Hispanic)	Pop 1990	Pop 2000	Pop 2010	Pop 2020	% 1990	% 2000	% 2010	% 2020
White alone (NH)	2,164	2,065	2,044	1,797	87.82%	86.44%	86.03%	81.87%
Black or African American alone (NH)	290	283	260	226	11.77%	11.85%	10.94%	10.30%
Native American or Alaska Native alone (NH)	5	11	0	8	0.20%	0.46%	0.00%	0.36%
Asian alone (NH)	1	2	3	8	0.04%	0.08%	0.13%	0.36%
Native Hawaiian or Pacific Islander alone (NH)	x	0	0	0	x	0.00%	0.00%	0.00%
Other race alone (NH)	1	1	4	3	0.04%	0.04%	0.17%	0.14%
Mixed race or Multiracial (NH)	x	14	33	95	x	0.59%	1.39%	4.33%
Hispanic or Latino (any race)	3	13	32	58	0.12%	0.54%	1.35%	2.64%
Total	2,464	2,389	2,376	2,195	100.00%	100.00%	100.00%	100.00%

As of the 2020 census, there were 2,195 people and 667 families residing in the city.

The median age was 44.8 years. 21.1% of residents were under the age of 18 and 22.4% of residents were 65 years of age or older. For every 100 females there were 80.2 males, and for every 100 females age 18 and over there were 78.9 males age 18 and over.

0.0% of residents lived in urban areas, while 100.0% lived in rural areas.

There were 947 households in Guin, of which 26.0% had children under the age of 18 living in them. Of all households, 40.2% were married-couple households, 19.5% were households with a male householder and no spouse or partner present, and 35.9% were households with a female householder and no spouse or partner present. About 35.2% of all households were made up of individuals and 14.8% had someone living alone who was 65 years of age or older.

There were 1,088 housing units, of which 13.0% were vacant. The homeowner vacancy rate was 3.2% and the rental vacancy rate was 10.5%.

=== 2010 census ===
At the 2010 census there were 2,376 people in 1,029 households, including 647 families, in the city. The population density was 190.1 inhabitants per square mile (73.4/km^{2}). There were 1,119 housing units at an average density of 89.5 per square mile (34.6/km^{2}). The racial makeup of the city was 86.9% White, 10.9% Black or African American, 0% Native American, 0.1% Asian, 0.6% from other races, and 1.4% from two or more races. 1.3% of the population were Hispanic or Latino of any race.

Of the 1,029 households 25.9% had children under the age of 18 living with them, 42.7% were married couples living together, 16.0% had a female householder with no husband present, and 37.1% were non-families. 34.2% of households were one person and 15.3% were one person aged 65 or older. The average household size was 2.22 and the average family size was 2.81.

The age distribution was 22.8% under the age of 18, 6.7% from 18 to 24, 23.4% from 25 to 44, 26.2% from 45 to 64, and 20.9% 65 or older. The median age was 43.3 years. For every 100 females, there were 86.8 males. For every 100 females age 18 and over, there were 86.7 males.

The median household income was $28,571 and the median family income was $41,375. Males had a median income of $30,670 versus $27,788 for females. The per capita income for the city was $20,359. About 17.9% of families and 20.6% of the population were below the poverty line, including 26.9% of those under age 18 and 19.2% of those age 65 or over.

=== 2000 census ===
At the 2000 census there were 2,389 people in 1,027 households, including 666 families, in the city. The population density was 191.5 inhabitants per square mile (73.9/km^{2}). There were 1,168 housing units at an average density of 93.6 per square mile (36.1/km^{2}). The racial makeup of the city was 86.69% White, 11.85% Black or African American, 0.46% Native American, 0.08% Asian, 0.29% from other races, and 0.63% from two or more races. 0.54% of the population were Hispanic or Latino of any race. Of the 1,027 households 28.7% had children under the age of 18 living with them, 49.1% were married couples living together, 13.7% had a female householder with no husband present, and 35.1% were non-families. 32.7% of households were one person and 16.9% were one person aged 65 or older. The average household size was 2.26 and the average family size was 2.88.

The age distribution was 23.0% under the age of 18, 7.7% from 18 to 24, 25.6% from 25 to 44, 24.1% from 45 to 64, and 19.7% 65 or older. The median age was 40 years. For every 100 females, there were 84.2 males. For every 100 females age 18 and over, there were 79.9 males.

The median household income was $26,618 and the median family income was $35,174. Males had a median income of $31,019 versus $21,316 for females. The per capita income for the city was $14,690. About 19.2% of families and 20.9% of the population were below the poverty line, including 26.9% of those under age 18 and 18.5% of those age 65 or over.

== Education ==
Guin is a part of the Marion County School system. Marion County High School houses grades 7–12. MCHS is the oldest high school in the county. Guin Elementary School hosts grades K–6.

== Athletics ==
Their mascot is a Red Raider, with their colors being red and white. In 2011, their football team won the AHSAA (Alabama High School Athletics Association) Class 1A Football championship. In 2012, they were the runner up in the AHSAA 1A Championship. Guin also won the Class 1A Football championship in 1971, 1972, and 1973.

== Notable people ==
- Rece Davis, sports television journalist for ESPN/ABC
- Bud Riley, college football coach, brother of Hayden Riley
- Hayden Riley, head coach of the Alabama Crimson Tide men's basketball and baseball team
