= Alabama State Route 13 =

State highway in Alabama, United States

State Route 13

Route information
- Maintained by ALDOT
- Length: 335.995 mi (540.732 km) Most of length signed as US 43

Standalone section
- Length: 60.498 mi (97.362 km)
- South end: US 43 / SR 18 west of Berry
- Major intersections: I-22 / US 78 north of Eldridge; US 278 at Natural Bridge
- North end: US 43 / SR 17 south of Russellville

Location
- Country: United States
- State: Alabama
- Counties: Fayette, Walker, Winston, Marion, Franklin

Highway system
- Alabama State Highway System; Interstate; US; State
← SR 12	→ SR 14

State Route 13 (SR 13) is a 335.995-mile-long (540.732 km) state highway in the western part of the U.S. state of Alabama. Except for a portion roughly between Berry and Russellville, SR 13 is the unsigned designation for U.S. Route 43 (US 43). Thus, while the total distance of the route is over 330 miles (530 km), as an independently signed route, SR 13 is only 60 miles (97 km) long.

The southern terminus of US 43 and SR 13 is at their intersection with US 90 and unsigned SR 16 in Mobile. The northern terminus of the route is on US 43 at the Tennessee state line north of Killen in Lauderdale County. As a signed route, the southern terminus of the route is at the intersection of US 43 and SR 18 in southern Fayette County, and the northern terminus as at US 43 and SR 17 south of Russellville in Franklin County.

== Route description ==
In Phil Campbell, SR 13 splits off of US 43, continuing on its right-of-way. It enters the town and meets SR 237. It then enters Marion County. It enters Bear Creek and intersects SR 172. It turns east-to-west and leaves Marion County, entering into Winston County. The route immediately enters the city of Haleyville. It turns north-to-south again and meets SR 195 and SR 129. It leaves the city and continues south for about ten miles to Natural Bridge. It intersects SR 5 south and US 278. SR 5 continues south along SR 13's right-of-way. SR 13 maintains a mile-long concurrency with US Route 278, before turning onto its own right-of-way. It continues south until it crosses the county line into Walker County. It eventually intersects I-22/US 78 and also passes through Eldridge, meeting SR 118 in the process. It then crosses into Fayette County. It intersects SR 102 near Hubbertville. It enters Berry and meets US 43 once again with SR 18. US 43 joins SR 13 along its journey south to Tuscaloosa and Mobile. SR 18 continues east to Oakman. This route serves as an effective bypass to US 43 for people traveling from Muscle Shoals to Tuscaloosa, or even making the long drive down all the way to Mobile, bypassing multiple large cities and not diverting from its path like US 43.

== Future ==
Highway 13 is planned to be four lanes from US 43 to US 278. A bypass around Haleyville has been partially built with only the two twin bridges over Little Bear Creek having been completed. Construction stopped in 2012 due to funding constraints.

== Major intersections ==
County	Location	mi	km	Destinations	Notes
Fayette	Fruitdale, Fayette County	226.727	364.882	US 43 north / SR 18 – Fayette, Berry	Northern end of US 43 overlap
Fayette	Mater, Fayette County	238.605	383.998	SR 102 – Fayette, Jasper	
Walker	Eldridge	247.548	398.390	SR 118 – Winfield, Jasper	
Walker		249.547	401.607	I-22 / US 78 (SR 4) – Hamilton, Birmingham	I-22 exit 39
Winston	Natural Bridge	259.584	417.760	US 278 west (SR 74) – Hamilton	Southern end of US 278 overlap
Winston	Natural Bridge	260.040	418.494	US 278 east (SR 74) – Double Springs SR 5 south – Jasper	Northern end of US 278 overlap
Winston	Haleyville	269.514	433.741	SR 129 south – Winfield	
Winston	Haleyville	270.388	435.147	SR 195 south – Double Springs	
Marion	Bear Creek	276.748	445.383	SR 172 west – Hackleburg	
Franklin	Phil Campbell	282.485	454.616	SR 237 south – Hamilton, Northwest Shoals Community College	
Franklin		287.225	462.244	US 43 south / SR 17 south – Hackleburg, Hamilton, York, Butler, Mobile	Southern end of US 43/SR 17 overlap
1.000 mi = 1.609 km; 1.000 km = 0.621 mi: Concurrency terminus
