= Alabama State Route 172 =

State highway in Alabama, United States

State Route 172

Route information
- Maintained by ALDOT
- Length: 24.420 mi (39.300 km)

Major junctions
- West end: SR 19 in Vina
- US 43 / SR 17 in Hackleburg
- East end: SR 13 in Bear Creek

Location
- Country: United States
- State: Alabama
- Counties: Franklin, Marion

Highway system
- Alabama State Highway System; Interstate; US; State
← SR 171	→ SR 173

State Route 172 (SR 172) is a 24.420-mile (39.300 km) state highway that serves as an east-west connection between Vina and Bear Creek through Franklin and Marion Counties. SR 172 intersects SR 19 at its western terminus and SR 13 at its eastern terminus.

== Route description ==
SR 172 begins at its intersection with SR 19 in Vina. From this point, SR 172 travels in a southeasterly direction where it meets SR 187 in Hodges. From Hodges, the route continues generally in its eastern direction and intersects US 43/SR 17 in Hackleburg. From this point, SR 172 again continues generally in an easterly direction and intersects SR 237, in addition to sharing a .435-mile (0.700 km) concurrency with SR 241, prior to reaching its eastern terminus at SR 13 in Bear Creek.

== Major intersections ==
County	Location	mi	km	Destinations	Notes
Franklin	Vina	0.0	0.0	SR 19 – Downtown, Red Bay, Detroit	Western terminus
Franklin	Hodges	8.011	12.892	SR 187 – Belgreen, Hamilton	
Marion	Hackleburg	15.448	24.861	US 43 / SR 17 – Hamilton, Russellville	
Marion	Hackleburg	15.481	24.914	SR 253 south (Clay Street) – Yampertown, Winfield	Northern terminus of SR 253
Marion		20.593	33.141	SR 237 north – Phil Campbell	Southern terminus of SR 237
Marion	Bear Creek	22.934	36.909	SR 241 north – Phil Campbell	Western end of concurrency with SR 241
Marion	Bear Creek	23.369	37.609	SR 241 south	Eastern end of concurrency with SR 241
Marion	Bear Creek	24.420	39.300	SR 13 – Phil Campbell, Haleyville	Eastern terminus
1.000 mi = 1.609 km; 1.000 km = 0.621 mi: Concurrency terminus
