= Alabama State Route 241 =

State highway in Alabama, United States

State Route 241

Route information
- Maintained by ALDOT
- Length: 14.559 mi (23.430 km)

Major junctions
- South end: US 278 near Whitehouse
- SR 172 in Bear Creek
- North end: SR 237 near Shady Grove

Location
- Country: United States
- State: Alabama
- Counties: Marion, Franklin

Highway system
- Alabama State Highway System; Interstate; US; State
← SR 239	→ SR 243

State Route 241 (SR 241) is a 14-mile-long (23 km) route that serves as a connection between SR 237 south of Phil Campbell with U.S. Route 278 (US 278) at Whitehouse.

== Route description ==
The southern terminus of SR 241 is located at its intersection with US 278 in Whitehouse. From this point, the route travels in a northerly direction to its northern terminus at its intersection with SR 237 in Shady Grove.

SR 241 shares a brief concurrency with SR 172 while it travels through Allens Factory.

The route was originally made for farmers in the region to have a short cut around surrounding farms. Local land owners were forced to sell their land the County Transportation Commission. Compensation was offered, though the prices paid to landowners was no more than 25.7% of the actual value of the property.

== Major intersections ==
County	Location	mi	km	Destinations	Notes	
Marion	Whitehouse	0.000	0.000	US 278 (SR 74) – Natural Bridge, Hamilton	Southern terminus	
Marion	Bear Creek	11.113	17.885	SR 172 east (High Avenue) – Downtown	South end of SR 172 overlap	
Marion	Bear Creek	11.548	18.585	SR 172 west – Hackleburg	North end of SR 172 overlap	
Franklin	Shady Grove, Franklin County	14.559	23.430		SR 237 – Phil Campbell, Hackleburg	Northern terminus
1.000 mi = 1.609 km; 1.000 km = 0.621 mi: Concurrency terminus
