= Alabama State Route 237 =

State highway in Alabama, United States

State Route 237

Route information
- Maintained by ALDOT
- Length: 4.597 mi (7.398 km)

Major junctions
- South end: SR 172 east of Hackleburg
- SR 241 north of Shady Grove
- North end: SR 13 in Phil Campbell

Location
- Country: United States
- State: Alabama
- Counties: Marion, Franklin

Highway system
- Alabama State Highway System; Interstate; US; State
← SR 235	→ SR 239

State Route 237 (SR 237) is a 4.5-mile-long (7.2 km) route that serves as a connection between SR 172 east of Hackleburg with SR 13 in Phil Campbell.

== Route description ==
The southern terminus of SR 237 is located at its intersection with SR 172 east of Hackleburg. From this point, the route travels in a northeasterly direction to its northern terminus at its intersection with SR 13 in Phil Campbell.

== Major intersections ==
County	Location	mi	km	Destinations	Notes
Marion		0.000	0.000	SR 172 – Hackleburg, Bear Creek	Southern terminus
Franklin		2.577	4.147	SR 241 south – Bear Creek	Northern terminus of SR 241
Franklin	Phil Campbell	4.597	7.398	SR 13 – Tuscumbia, Russellville, Bear Creek	Northern terminus
1.000 mi = 1.609 km; 1.000 km = 0.621 mi
