= Hackleburg tornado =

Hackleburg tornado may refer to:

- 1920 Hackleburg–Phil Campbell–Mehama tornado
- 1943 Hackleburg tornado
- 2011 Hackleburg–Phil Campbell tornado
