= Alabama State Route 187 =

State highway in Alabama, United States

State Route 187

Route information
- Maintained by ALDOT
- Length: 22.995 mi (37.007 km)

Major junctions
- South end: US 43 / SR 17 north of Hamilton
- SR 172 in Hodges
- North end: SR 24 in Belgreen

Location
- Country: United States
- State: Alabama
- Counties: Franklin, Marion

Highway system
- Alabama State Highway System; Interstate; US; State
← SR 186	→ SR 188

State Route 187 (SR 187) is a 22.995-mile (37.007 km) state highway that serves as a north-south connection through central Franklin and Marion Counties. SR 187 intersects US 43 at its southern terminus and SR 24 at its northern terminus.

== Route description ==
SR 187 begins just north of Hamilton at its intersection with US 43. From this point, the route travels in a northerly direction except for a brief turn to the east where it meets SR 172 in Hodges. From Hodges, SR 187 returns to its northerly routing en route to its northern terminus at SR 24 in Belgreen.

== Major intersections ==
County	Location	mi	km	Destinations	Notes
Marion		0.0	0.0	US 43 / SR 17 – Hamilton, Hackleburg	Southern terminus
Franklin	Hodges	8.011	12.892	SR 172 – Vina, Hackleburg	
Franklin	Belgreen	22.995	37.007	SR 24 – Red Bay, Russellville	Northern terminus
1.000 mi = 1.609 km; 1.000 km = 0.621 mi
