= Hodges, Alabama =

- Town
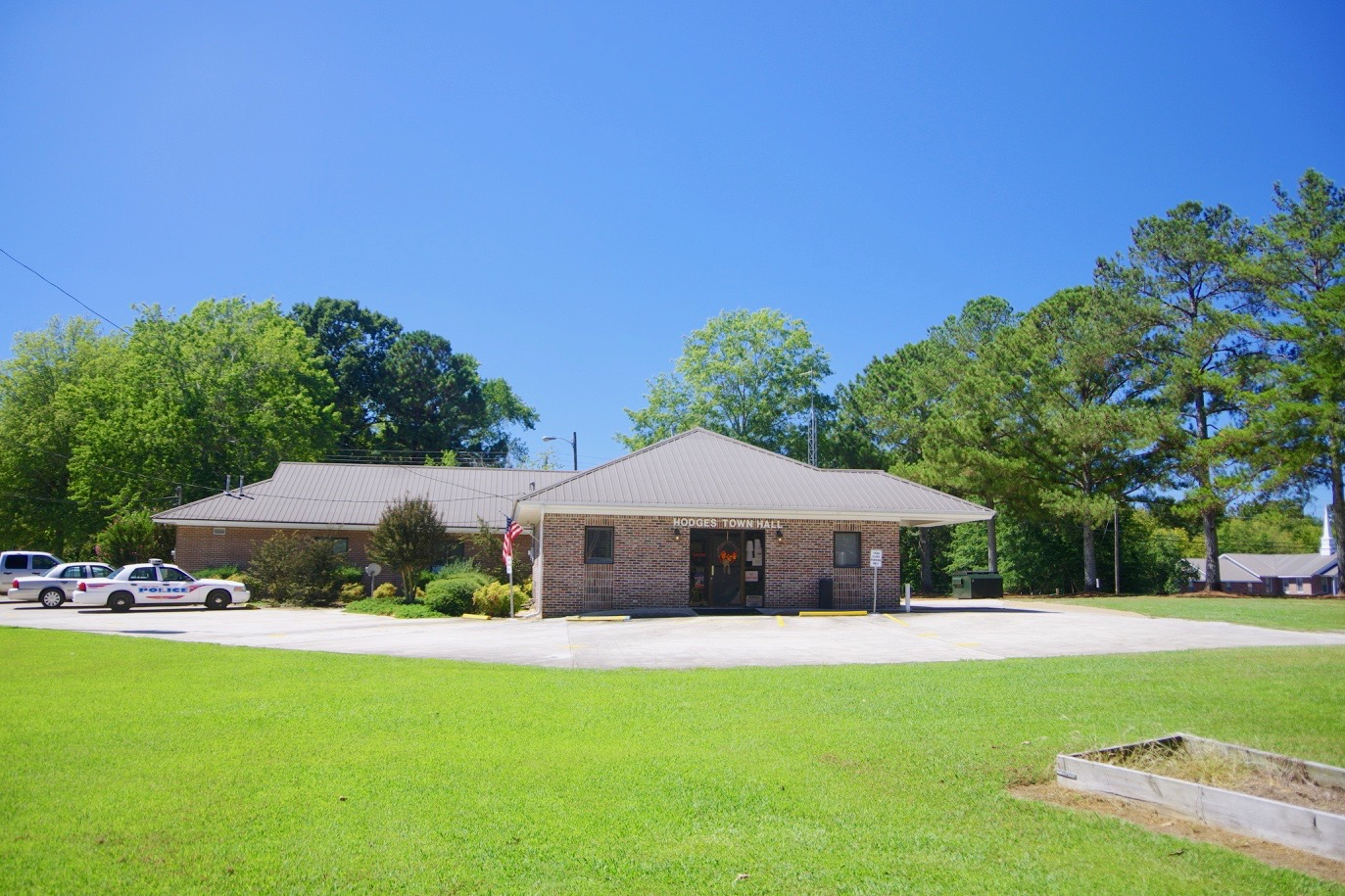
- Town Hall

- Location of Hodges in Franklin County, Alabama.
- Coordinates: 34°20′02″N 87°55′47″W
- Country: United States
- State: Alabama
- County: Franklin

Area
  - Total: 4.14 sq mi (10.71 km^{2})
  - Land: 4.13 sq mi (10.69 km^{2})
  - Water: 0.0077 sq mi (0.02 km^{2})
- Elevation: 850 ft (260 m)

Population (2020)
  - Total: 265
  - Density: 64.2/sq mi (24.79/km^{2})
- Time zone: UTC-6 (Central (CST))
  - Summer (DST): UTC-5 (CDT)
- ZIP code: 35571
- Area codes: 205,256
- FIPS code: 01-35200
- GNIS feature ID: 2405846
- Website: hodgesal.com

Hodges is a town in Franklin County, Alabama, United States. At the 2020 census, the population was 265. Hodges was laid out in 1902.

== History ==
A community known as "Reid Brake" was established at what is now Hodges in the 1880s. The current town was established in 1907 as a stop along the Illinois Central Railroad and named for a prominent local family. The town incorporated in 1913, and reincorporated in 1919.

== Geography ==
Hodges is located in southern Franklin County. The southern border of the town follows the Marion County line. Alabama State Route 172 passes through the town, leading northwest 9 miles (14 km) to Vina and southeast 7 miles (11 km) to Hackleburg. Alabama State Route 187 leads northeast from the center of Hodges 13 miles (21 km) to Belgreen.

According to the U.S. Census Bureau, the town has a total area of 4.1 square miles (10.7 km^{2}), of which 0.01 square miles (0.02 km^{2}), or 0.15%, is water. The town sits on the Tennessee Valley Divide, with the east side draining to Bear Creek, a north-flowing tributary of the Tennessee River, and the west side draining via Skirum Branch to Bull Mountain Creek, a west-flowing tributary of the Tombigbee River. 2 miles (3 km) north of Hodges is Rock Bridge Canyon Park, on bluffs overlooking Bear Creek.

== Demographics ==
Historical population
| Census | Pop. | Note | %± |
|---|---|---|---|
| 1920 | 279 | | — |
| 1930 | 247 | | −11.5% |
| 1940 | 260 | | 5.3% |
| 1950 | 220 | | −15.4% |
| 1960 | 194 | | −11.8% |
| 1970 | 207 | | 6.7% |
| 1980 | 250 | | 20.8% |
| 1990 | 272 | | 8.8% |
| 2000 | 261 | | −4.0% |
| 2010 | 288 | | 10.3% |
| 2020 | 265 | | −8.0% |
U.S. Decennial Census; 2013 Estimate

As of the census of 2000, there were 261 people, 98 households, and 78 families residing in the town. The population density was 84.2 inhabitants per square mile (32.5/km^{2}). There were 118 housing units at an average density of 38.1 per square mile (14.7/km^{2}). The racial makeup of the town was 100.00% White.

There were 98 households, out of which 32.7% had children under the age of 18 living with them, 62.2% were married couples living together, 14.3% had a female householder with no husband present, and 19.4% were non-families. 19.4% of all households were made up of individuals, and 11.2% had someone living alone who was 65 years of age or older. The average household size was 2.66 and the average family size was 3.05.

In the town, the population was spread out, with 23.0% under the age of 18, 10.0% from 18 to 24, 26.1% from 25 to 44, 23.8% from 45 to 64, and 17.2% who were 65 years of age or older. The median age was 39 years. For every 100 females, there were 97.7 males. For every 100 females age 18 and over, there were 97.1 males.

The median income for a household in the town was $33,750, and the median income for a family was $38,333. Males had a median income of $35,625 versus $17,500 for females. The per capita income for the town was $25,239. About 14.0% of families and 13.4% of the population were below the poverty line, including 12.3% of those under the age of eighteen and 18.2% of those 65 or over.
