= April 1920 tornado outbreak =

Weather event in the United States

Meteorological history
- Formed: April 19, 1920
- Dissipated: April 21, 1920

Tornado outbreak
- Tornadoes: ≥ 17
- Max. rating: F4 tornado
- Duration: ~ 2 days, 2 hours, 15 minutes

Overall effects
- Fatalities: ≥ 243 fatalities
- Injuries: ≥ 1,374 injuries
- Areas affected: Southern United States

On April 19–21, 1920, a multi-day severe weather event affected the Southeastern United States. The most intense portion of the outbreak occurred on the morning of April 20. At least seven tornadoes affected the American U.S. states of Mississippi, Alabama, and Tennessee, six of them rated violent F4s on the Fujita scale. The tornado outbreak killed at least 243 people.

Five of the tornadoes were long tracked, each traveling more than 32 miles (51 km) across Mississippi and into Alabama. A tornado that began in Oktibbeha County, Mississippi, crossed into Alabama and lifted over Limestone County, having covered a distance of more than 130 mi (210 km). Along its path, the tornado destroyed entire communities and killed at least 44 people in Alabama, becoming the state's deadliest tornado until March 21, 1932, when another F4 tornado killed 49 people. An EF5 tornado on April 27, 2011, is currently the state's deadliest on record, with 72 fatalities.

In addition to the tornadoes on April 20, other tornadoes associated with the same weather system occurred on April 19 and April 21. (Note: An outbreak is generally defined as a group of at least six tornadoes (the number sometimes varies slightly according to local climatology) with no more than a six-hour gap between individual tornadoes. An outbreak sequence, prior to (after) the start of modern records in 1950, is defined as a period of no more than two (one) consecutive days without at least one significant (F2 or stronger) tornado.) (Note: The Fujita scale was devised under the aegis of scientist T. Theodore Fujita in the early 1970s. Prior to the advent of the scale in 1971, tornadoes in the United States were officially unrated. While the Fujita scale has been superseded by the Enhanced Fujita scale in the U.S. since February 1, 2007, Canada utilized the old scale until April 1, 2013; nations elsewhere, like the United Kingdom, apply other classifications such as the TORRO scale.) (Note: Historically, the number of tornadoes globally and in the United States was and is likely underrepresented: research by Grazulis on annual tornado activity suggests that, as of 2001, only 53% of yearly U.S. tornadoes were officially recorded. Documentation of tornadoes outside the United States was historically less exhaustive, owing to the lack of monitors in many nations and, in some cases, to internal political controls on public information. Most countries only recorded tornadoes that produced severe damage or loss of life. Significant low biases in U.S. tornado counts likely occurred through the early 1990s, when advanced NEXRAD was first installed and the National Weather Service began comprehensively verifying tornado occurrences.)

== Background ==
Toward the end of the period from April 10–20, 1920, a broad trough extended from the Rocky Mountains to the Great Plains, producing inclement weather. At 7:00 a.m. EST (13:00 UTC) on April 20, observations from local stations indicated a low-pressure area of at most 29.6 inches of mercury (1,002 mb) over the Lower Mississippi River near Memphis, Tennessee. A counterclockwise circulation was evident on the daily weather maps, with a trailing cold front approaching Mississippi from the west. An influx of warm, moist air from the Gulf of Mexico yielded surface temperatures of 70° F or greater as far north as Nashville, with mid to upper 70s over the southern halves of Mississippi and Alabama. Conditions were described as being "cloudy and sultry", even during the preceding night, with little fluctuation in relative humidity. Due to a steep temperature gradient and low-level moisture, atmospheric instability was conducive for convective growth, with a convergence zone providing sufficient wind shear for supercells. Relatively colder air above the surface also invaded the warm sector, further heightening parameters for severe thunderstorms. Despite widespread cloud cover, high temperatures in Alabama attained 85 °F or higher at several stations, illustrating the richness of the unstable air mass.

== Confirmed tornadoes ==
Confirmed tornadoes by Fujita rating
FU	F0	F1	F2	F3	F4	F5	Total
≥ 3	?	?	6	2	6	0	≥ 17

=== April 19 event ===
Confirmed tornadoes – Monday, April 19, 1920 (Note: All dates are based on the local time zone where the tornado touched down; however, all times are in Coordinated Universal Time and dates are split at midnight CST/CDT for consistency.) (Note: Prior to 1994, only the average widths of tornado paths were officially listed.)
F#	Location	County / Parish	State	Time (UTC)	Path length	Max. width	Summary
FU	Mickles	Yell	AR	06:00–?	Unknown	Unknown	First confirmed tornado of the outbreak touched down approximately 6 mi (9.7 km) east of Danville. Damages, if any, were unstated.
F3	Huckleberry Mountain to NNE of Piney Bay	Logan, Johnson, Pope	AR	06:15–?	15 miles (24 km)	400 yards (370 m)	9 deaths – Tornado touched down in what is now the Ozark National Forest and headed northeast, hitting just outside New Blaine. Tornado resulted in the destruction of a bridge over Big Piney Creek, the second such instance since it was first built. Afterward, the tornado struck the Piney area, with five fatalities just to the north-northeast of the community. Their bodies and cooking utensils, along with their stove, were carried several hundred yards. All five deaths were in one family. Four other deaths and a total of 40 injuries occurred along the path. The tornado curved to the north after striking Piney before dissipating.
F3	NE of Stafford to W of Mount Nebo	Yell, Logan	AR	06:15–?	10 miles (16 km)	400 yards (370 m)	10 deaths – A second strong tornado touched down at the same time as the previous event. It began northeast of Stafford and, like the preceding, also headed northeast. The tornado passed close to Alpha and briefly entered a small segment of Logan County before re-entering Yell County. As it did so, it killed seven people in one family, not far from the Harkey Valley community. All 10 deaths were in or near Harkey Valley. The noise of the tornado was reportedly heard for several miles. There were 10 confirmed injuries.
F2	S of Harrison	Boone	AR	07:00–?	5 miles (8.0 km)	400 yards (370 m)	A tornado—dimly visible, as if illuminated—tore off roofs from 12 homes and splintered sizable trees in its path.
F2	St. Joe	Searcy	AR	08:00–?	5 miles (8.0 km)	100 yards (91 m)	A tornado injured 15 people as it hit St. Joe, wrecking the business district and a railroad depot. Two deaths may have occurred but were unconfirmed.
F2	SW of Union	Franklin, St. Charles	MO	23:45–?	12 miles (19 km)	100 yards (91 m)	A tornado touched down just outside Union, flattening many barns and wrecking a bridge. As it continued on, the tornado tore the roof off a shoe manufacturer. Rain soaked 75,000 pairs of shoes inside the factory. The tornado became a spectacular-looking waterspout over the Missouri River, reportedly lifting "millions of gallons" of water into the air. One person was injured.

=== April 20 event ===
Confirmed tornadoes – Tuesday, April 20, 1920
F#	Location	County / Parish	State	Time (UTC)	Path length	Max. width	Summary
F4	Ingomar to Glen	Union, Tippah, Prentiss, Alcorn, Tishomingo	MS	13:00–?	60 miles (97 km)	400 yards (370 m)	24 deaths – Beginning in Ingomar, this was the first in a series of long-tracked, violent tornadoes in eastern Mississippi, several of which were part of tornado families. The tornadoes each formed about 60 mi (97 km) apart and pursued roughly parallel trajectories. The Ingomar–Glen tornado claimed six lives as it touched down; later, it continued into six other settlements, causing immense destruction. Homes were leveled or sustained significant damage in Baker, Keownville, "Five", and Glen. Near the end of its path, the tornado struck a home with five children inside, killing all. 180 injuries were distributed throughout the path, which mostly crossed rural, underdeveloped areas.
F4	Bradley, MS to NE of Town Creek, AL	Oktibbeha (MS), Clay (MS), Monroe (MS), Itawamba (MS), Marion (AL), Franklin (AL), Colbert (AL), Lawrence (AL)	MS, AL	14:00–?	130 miles (210 km)	800 yards (730 m)	88 deaths – See section on this tornado — 700 people were injured and losses totaled $2 million.
F4	Deemer	Neshoba, Winston	MS	14:30–?	40 miles (64 km)	400 yards (370 m)	27 deaths – A devastating tornado formed near the southwestern edge of Neshoba County and moved northeast, passing a short distance south of Philadelphia. As it did so, it destroyed several homes, with three deaths in the countryside, before striking the lumber camp at Deemer. 19 fatalities occurred there, though the total may have been even higher. There were no shelters in which to seek refuge, which probably heightened the death toll. Extreme damage occurred along much of the path, with five additional deaths confirmed in Winston County, where more homes were wrecked. In all, the tornado injured 60 people.
F?	S of Waynesboro	Wayne	TN	15:00–?	Unknown	Unknown	The storm that spawned the Ingomar tornado crossed into Tennessee and produced another tornado near Waynesboro in Wayne County.
F4	Bay Springs to Russell	Jasper, Clarke, Lauderdale	MS	15:55–?	45 miles (72 km)	400 yards (370 m)	36 deaths – The last of the four violent tornadoes to form in Mississippi, this was likely the most damaging in the state. The tornado touched down close to Bay Springs and killed seven people near that town. The tornado also hurled a car hundreds of yards. As it tracked to the northeast across Jasper County, it produced 14 more deaths in the county, most of which were in or near the Rose Hill community. In the county alone, 110 injuries were reported and 103 "occupied" buildings sustained severe damage or were blown away. As it crossed into Lauderdale County, the tornado produced extreme damage to homes and vegetation, beginning near Savoy and continuing to Bonita. The tornado splintered trees "like kindling wood" and flattened numerous small homes, several of which almost vanished. The tornado caused 11 deaths in suburban Meridian. Major damage occurred in Bonita, including the destruction of a school, a church, and 25 homes. The tornado later ended between Marion and Russell. Documents from Bay Springs were later found 50 miles (80 km) away. 200 people were injured along the entire path.
F4	SW of Carbon Hill to Lacey's Spring	Fayette, Walker, Winston, Cullman, Morgan	AL	16:00–?	50 miles (80 km)	400 yards (370 m)	21 deaths – This intense tornado may have developed from the supercell that produced the F4 tornado near Deemer in Neshoba County, Mississippi. Starting southwest of Carbon Hill, the tornado widened to 400 yd (1,200 ft) and downed trees as it moved northeast through eight communities, leveling numerous homes. It first tracked near Pocahontas and Saragossa, later missing Manchester to the north. As it bypassed Manchester, the tornado destroyed homes and barns in the community of Bennett. Farther northeast, the tornado struck the town of Arley, killing one person and obliterating homes and farms. Next, the tornado ravaged the community of Helicon, where all homes but one were destroyed. A swath was "swept clean" in Helicon and nearby Nesmith. In and near Arley and Helicon, the tornado caused 19 confirmed deaths, yet the actual total may have been greater. The tornado continued northeast to the Vinemont area, destroying two homes and killing a woman near Lacon. Other homes and barns lost their roofs or were wrecked before the tornado lifted not far from Lacey's Spring. 50 injuries occurred along the entire path.
F2	SW of Burwood to N of Thompson's Station	Williamson, Maury	TN	16:30–?	15 miles (24 km)	Unknown	1 death – The Ingomar–Waynesboro supercell continued into Williamson County and produced yet another tornado. This tornado damaged or destroyed approximately 60 structures, among them six homes, with 10 injuries.
F4	S of Lily Flagg to Brownsboro	Madison	AL	18:30–?	20 miles (32 km)	400 yards (370 m)	27 deaths – This tornado, the final F4 of the outbreak, developed from the preceding storm as it neared the Tennessee River. Observers first noted a visible funnel cloud about 10 mi (16 km) southwest of Lily Flagg village that crossed the river into Madison County. The tornado formed a few miles south of Lilly Flagg as a "great, black, whirling cloud" near Green Cove. The tornado leveled large swaths of forest, obliterated farms and tenant homes, and destroyed sturdy "country homes." Reportedly, the tornado snapped or removed all fencing in its path and also lofted trees long distances onto hillsides. Much damage occurred as the tornado passed east of Brownsboro and west of Gurley, where a path 60 yd (180 ft) wide was reportedly "swept clean" of debris. 100 injuries occurred along the path.

=== April 21 event ===
Confirmed tornadoes – Wednesday, April 21, 1920
F#	Location	County / Parish	State	Time (UTC)	Path length	Max. width	Summary
F2	Cedar Rock	Chester	SC	08:00–?	Unknown	50 yards (46 m)	One small home was reportedly flattened as a tornado injured three people.
F2	Sandy Springs	Anderson	SC	08:00–?	2 miles (3.2 km)	200 yards (180 m)	A tornado damaged most of the structures in Sandy Springs and destroyed barns and tenant homes. Five people sustained injuries.

=== Starkville–Aberdeen, Mississippi/Hackleburg–Phil Campbell–Mehama, Alabama ===
Starkville–Aberdeen, Mississippi/Hackleburg–Phil Campbell–Mehama, Alabama
F4 tornado
- on the Fujita scale

Overall effects
- Fatalities: 88
- Injuries: 700
- Damage: $2 million (1920 USD) $32.1 million (2025 USD)

This deadly, destructive and long-lived tornado developed near Bradley, northeast of Sturgis in Oktibbeha County. The funnel rapidly began producing "devastating" damage as it passed northwest of Starkville, with seven dead. Moving northeast, the tornado killed 10 more people near Cedarbluff in Clay County, leveling many homes. Its path was then 200 to 300 yd (600 to 900 ft) wide. Thereafter, the tornado entered Monroe County and proceeded to ravage the western part of Aberdeen. Twenty-two people died there, though it was the only sizable town in the path. Widening to at least 1/4 mile (440 yd) wide, the tornado killed five more people in the county before crossing Itawamba County and then moving into Marion County, Alabama. In all, the tornado flattened more than 200 homes, mostly small, in Mississippi.

In Alabama, it leveled entire farms south of Bexar, with nine deaths. One farm alone reported 500 hogs killed. In Marion County alone, the 1/2-mile-wide (0.80 km) tornado killed 20 people and injured about 200, leveling 87 homes and damaging 100, especially in the Hackleburg area. In one area, a Ford automobile was hurled 1/4 mi (0.40 km), and a swath up to 1 1/2 mi (2.4 km) wide was reportedly "swept clean" as homes vanished. In Franklin County, the tornado continued to destroy homes near Phil Campbell and Spruce Pine, but most of the deaths were near the Waco quarry, east of Russellville, where small homes were said to have been "wiped out" and swept away. 19 people died in and near the quarry, nine of whom were part of a family. Nearby, large oak trees were wrested from the earth, huge stones thrown "like a feather", and half of a large boulder transported to Littleville, about 11 mi (18 km) away.

Continuing into southeast Colbert County, the tornado flattened the Mehama community south of Leighton. There, four people died, many homes were destroyed, and numerous cattle were killed; notably, a Ford vehicle, hurled some distance, was stripped of its wheel casings. One other home was destroyed nearby at Wolf Springs. Afterward, the tornado lost intensity, after having maintained F4 or greater strength for more than 100 mi (160 km). Southeast of Town Creek, the tornado killed one more person before losing detection near the Tennessee River; the termination of its path is unknown and may have been in Limestone County, Alabama, or southern Tennessee. Pronounced darkness occurred at several locations in the path of the storm; one observer near Waco noted that there was no daylight and conditions were "dark as midnight."

== See also ==
- 1974 Guin tornado – Roughly paralleled the 1920 and 2011 events
- List of North American tornadoes and tornado outbreaks
- 2011 Hackleburg–Phil Campbell tornado – a violent EF5 tornado that hit some of the same towns in 2011.

== Sources ==
- Grazulis, Thomas P. (July 1993). Significant Tornadoes 1680–1991: A Chronology and Analysis of Events. St. Johnsbury, Vermont: The Tornado Project of Environmental Films. ISBN 1-879362-03-1.
- Grazulis, Thomas P. (2001a). The Tornado: Nature's Ultimate Windstorm. Norman: University of Oklahoma Press. ISBN 978-0-8061-3538-0.
- Grazulis, Thomas P. (2001b). F5-F6 Tornadoes. St. Johnsbury, Vermont: The Tornado Project of Environmental Films.
