= 1943 Hackleburg tornado =

1943 tornado in Alabama, U.S.

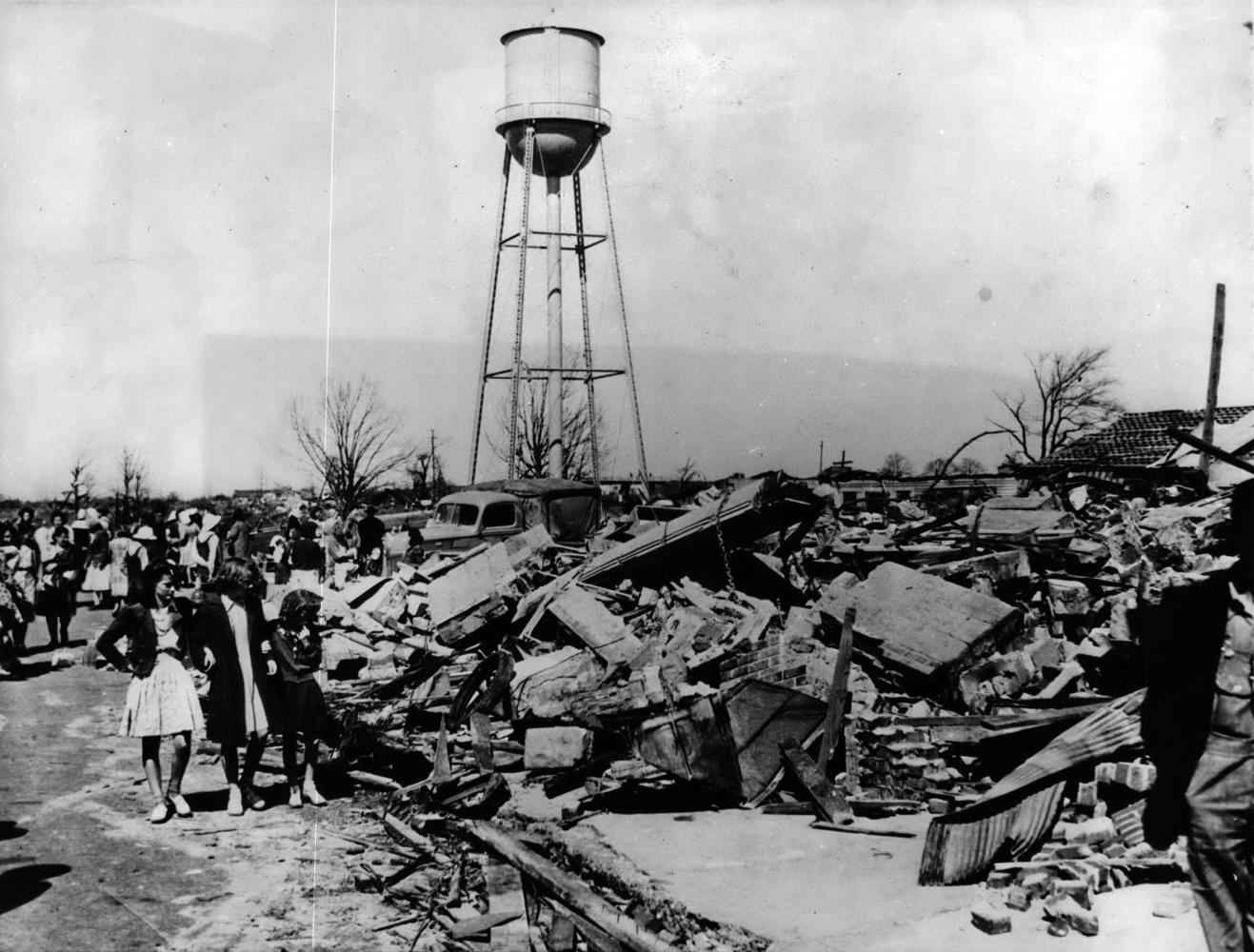
- Violent damage in downtown Hackleburg

Meteorological history
- Date: April 12, 1943

F4 equiv. tornado
- Max width: 200 yd (0.11 mi; 0.18 km)
- Highest winds: >207 mph (333 km/h)

Overall effects
- Fatalities: 4
- Injuries: 60
- Damage: $500,000 (1943 USD)
- Areas affected: Marion County, Alabama, particularly Hackleburg
- Part of the Tornadoes of 1943

In the early morning hours of April 12, 1943, a short-tracked but violent tornado passed through the town of Hackleburg, located in the U.S. state of Alabama. The tornado, which was rated F4 on the Fujita scale, destroyed a large portion of town and killed four people along a track spanning a width of 200 yards (180 m).

== Meteorological synopsis ==
On April 9 a cold front set up Western Plateau region of the United States, moving eastward into New Mexico over the following day.

Late on April 11, an area of thunderstorms existed from Tennessee to Central Kentucky, with a more scattered mode of storms being observed from Missouri to Arkansas. As the front moved into the Hackleburg area, heavy rain and darkness occurred, being successed shortly after by the tornado.

== Tornado summary ==
An aerial photo of downtown Hackleburg after the tornado.

The tornado impacted the town at around 2:30 a.m., being described as "having the noise of a freight train". An estimated two-thirds of Hackleburg was destroyed, with 85 homes and 17 more businesses being demolished in the tornado. The Bank of Hackleburg building suffered roofing damage during the event, being the only business in Hackleburg to not be completely destroyed. Inventory from businesses were blown several miles to the northeast. It reached a peak estimated width of 200 yards (180 m) while in town. 325 residents were left homeless, while power was cut in the area. Hackleburg mayor, C.E. Fell, estimated monetary damage in town at $500,000 (1943 USD).

Near Bear Creek, significant damage was done to buildings on a high school campus. Telephone lines were damaged in Franklin County before the tornado lifted.

In all, four people were killed by the tornado and 60 others sustained injuries.

== Aftermath ==
A monument in Hackleburg was constructed as a memorial for the fatalities in tornadoes in Hackleburg history.

== See also ==
- Tornadoes in Alabama
- 2011 Hackleburg–Phil Campbell tornado
- List of F4, EF4, and IF4 tornadoes
- April 1920 tornado outbreak

== References and sources ==
=== Sources ===
- Fulks, J.R. (1943). "Notes on Synoptic Situation Accompanying the Hackleburg, Alabama, Tornado of April 12, 1943". Federal Emergency Management Agency.
- Grazulis, Thomas P. (May 1984). Violent Tornado Climatography, 1880–1982. OSTI (Technical report). NUREG. Washington, D.C.: Nuclear Regulatory Commission. OSTI 7099491. CR-3670.
  - — (November 1990). Significant Tornadoes 1880–1989. Vol. 2. St. Johnsbury, Vermont: The Tornado Project of Environmental Films. ISBN 978-1-879362-02-4.
