= I. T. Quinn =

American conservationist (1887–1972)

I.T. Quinn
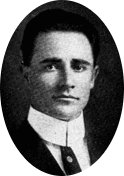
- Born: January 13, 1887; Belgreen, Alabama, USA
- Died: February 5, 1972 (aged 85); Grove Hill, Alabama, USA
- Occupations: Conservationist, game commissioner

Irvin Talton Quinn (January 13, 1887 – February 5, 1972) was an American conservationist who served as game commissioner of Alabama and Virginia and was one of the founders of the National Wildlife Federation.

I.T. Quinn was born in Belgreen, Alabama on January 13, 1887. He was educated at the Sixth District Agricultural School in Hamilton, Alabama and at the Alabama Polytechnic Institute, receiving a Bachelor of Science from the latter school in 1913. After graduation, he served as principal of Clarke County High School in Grove Hill from 1913 to 1914, and Lee County High School in Auburn, Alabama from 1914 to 1915. Quinn worked with the Alabama Extension Service in Montgomery County from 1915 through 1918, supervised the Division of Fertilizers of the Alabama State Department of Agriculture from 1919 to 1920, and directed county agents in northern Alabama for the United States Department of Agriculture from 1921 to 1922.

Quinn was appointed to the post of Conservation Commissioner of Alabama in February 1922 by Governor Thomas Kilby, replacing John H. Wallace Jr., who died in office. He was re-elected as Commissioner of Game and Fisheries in 1930. As Alabama game commissioner, Quinn rebuilt a wildlife population which had been virtually eliminated by poor conservation practices in the late 19th and early 20th centuries. Immediately upon assuming office, Quinn hired a force of game wardens, Alabama's first. Due to this and other conservation practices instituted under Quinn's leadership, Alabama's whitetail deer population—which was on the brink of extinction in 1920 with fewer than 2,000 animals—rebounded, with deer found in forty-three of Alabama's sixty-seven counties by 1939. Quinn was also instrumental in the passage of the Migratory Bird Conservation Act in 1929 and its successor law, the 1934 Migratory Bird Hunting Stamp Act, or Duck Stamp Act. He also instituted the annual Alabama Deep Sea Fishing Rodeo near Dauphin Island.

In February 1936, Quinn attended the North American Wildlife Conference in St. Louis, where he chaired the committee which created the National Wildlife Federation (then the General Wildlife Federation), and was subsequently elected that body's vice president. In 1939, he began to serve as director of public relations for the Federation. By 1947, Quinn had become executive director of the Virginia Commission of Game and Inland Fisheries. He served as executive director and executive secretary of that body until 1958, when he retired to Grove Hill, Alabama. Quinn died in Grove Hill on February 5, 1972.
