= Oscar Tompkins =

American lawyer

Member of the U.S. House of Representatives from Alabama's Houston County district
- In office 1918–1920

Personal details
- Born: 26 October 1883 Belgreen, Alabama
- Died: 28 June 1969 (aged 85) Dothan, Alabama
- Party: Democratic
- Spouse: Louisa Amanda Deason
- Education: University of Alabama, University of Tennessee
- Profession: Attorney

Oscar Lealon Tompkins (Belgreen, Alabama, 26 October 1883 - 28 June 1969) was an Alabama lawyer and state representative.

== Childhood, education ==
Tompkins, a Methodist was born in Franklin County, Alabama, to R.A. and Emma Fern Tompkins. His paternal grandparents came to Virginia from England and ended up in Alabama, via Kentucky and Tennessee. Tompkins attended summer school at the University of Alabama and the University of Tennessee in 1908 and 1910, and for a year (1912–1913) studied law at Alabama. He was admitted and started practice in Dothan in March 1914. In June 1914 he became partners with W.L. Lee. From 1906 to 1911 he was a teacher at and principal of Dothan High School; from 1916 to 1917 he was a presidential elector; in 1918 he was elected as a Democrat to the Alabama House of Representatives for Houston County. He married Louisa Amanda Deason on 29 April 1916.

== Career ==
Practicing in the small town of Dothan, Alabama, he was particularly concerned to keep "shysters," by which he probably meant Jewish personal injury lawyers, out of his city. Tompkins was working in a long tradition of Alabama resistance toward "Shylock" which was codified in the code of ethics of the Alabama State Bar—most of whose members were also members of the Ku Klux Klan. From 1928 to 1929, he was the president of the Alabama State Bar.
