= Northwest–Shoals Community College =

Public college in Alabama, US

Northwest Shoals Community College
- Type: Public community college
- Established: 1993 (by merger)
- Parent institution: Alabama Community College System
- President: Jeff Goodwin
- Students: 4,719
- Location: Muscle Shoals, Phil Campbell, Alabama, U.S. 34.7316°N 87.67802°W
- Campus: 110 acres (45 ha) in Muscle Shoals and 100 acres (40 ha) in Phil Campbell
- Colors: Navy blue & red
- Sporting affiliations: Region XXII, NJCAA (National Junior College Athletic Association)
- Mascot: Patriots/Vikings
- Website: www.nwscc.edu

Northwest Shoals Community College is a public community college with two campuses in Alabama, one in Phil Campbell and the second in Muscle Shoals. It is intended to serve Colbert County, Franklin County, Lauderdale County, Lawrence County, and portions of Winston County.

== History ==
The school was formed from a 1993 merger of Northwest Alabama Community College in Phil Campbell and Shoals Community College in Muscle Shoals, Alabama. Northwest Alabama Community College was the state's first junior college, formed in 1963 and first accredited in 1967. Shoals Community College was founded in 1966 as Joe Wheeler State Trade School. Joe Wheeler State Trade School changed its name to Muscle Shoals State Technical Institute and obtained accreditation from the Commission on Occupational Education Institutions in 1973.

In 1977, Northwest Alabama State Junior College established a branch campus in Tuscumbia, Alabama. The purpose of the expansion was to provide first and second year college courses for college preparation.

In 1989, Northwest Alabama State Junior College in Phil Campbell merged with Northwest Alabama State Technical College in Hamilton, Alabama. At the same time the Tuscumbia branch of Northwest Alabama State Junior College was merged into Muscle Shoals State Technical College to form Shoals Community College. The Commission on Colleges of the Southern Association of Colleges and Schools granted accreditation to Northwest Alabama Community College in 1990 and to Shoals Community College in 1991.

Finally, in 1993, the Alabama State Board of Education merged Northwest Alabama Community College and Shoals Community College to form Northwest–Shoals Community College. The Commission on Colleges of the Southern Association of Colleges and Schools approved the merger in 1993 and renewed the school's accreditation in 1999.

Northwest–Shoals Community College is part of the Alabama College System, a statewide system of postsecondary colleges, governed by the Alabama Board of Education. The school derives its original charter from the Alabama Trade School and Junior College Authority Act of 1963.

== Academics ==
The school awards Associate in Arts, Associate in Science, Associate in Applied Science, and Associate in Occupational Technology degrees as well as certificates in occupationally specific areas. Associate degrees are designated university parallel programs and are easily transferred to a four-year college or university such as the University of Alabama or UAB to complete a bachelor's degree. Certificate programs, in contrast to the associate degree, can last from one semester to two years and certify completion of specific technical or occupational training programs. Some of these programs do not require a high school degree. NW-SCC also offers two-year General Education and Business Administration transfer degrees through Distance Education. The school is accredited by the Commission on Colleges of the Southern Association of Colleges and Schools.
