= 2011 Hackleburg–Phil Campbell tornado =

2011 EF5 tornado in Alabama, U.S

Coordinates: 34.1043°N 88.1479°W

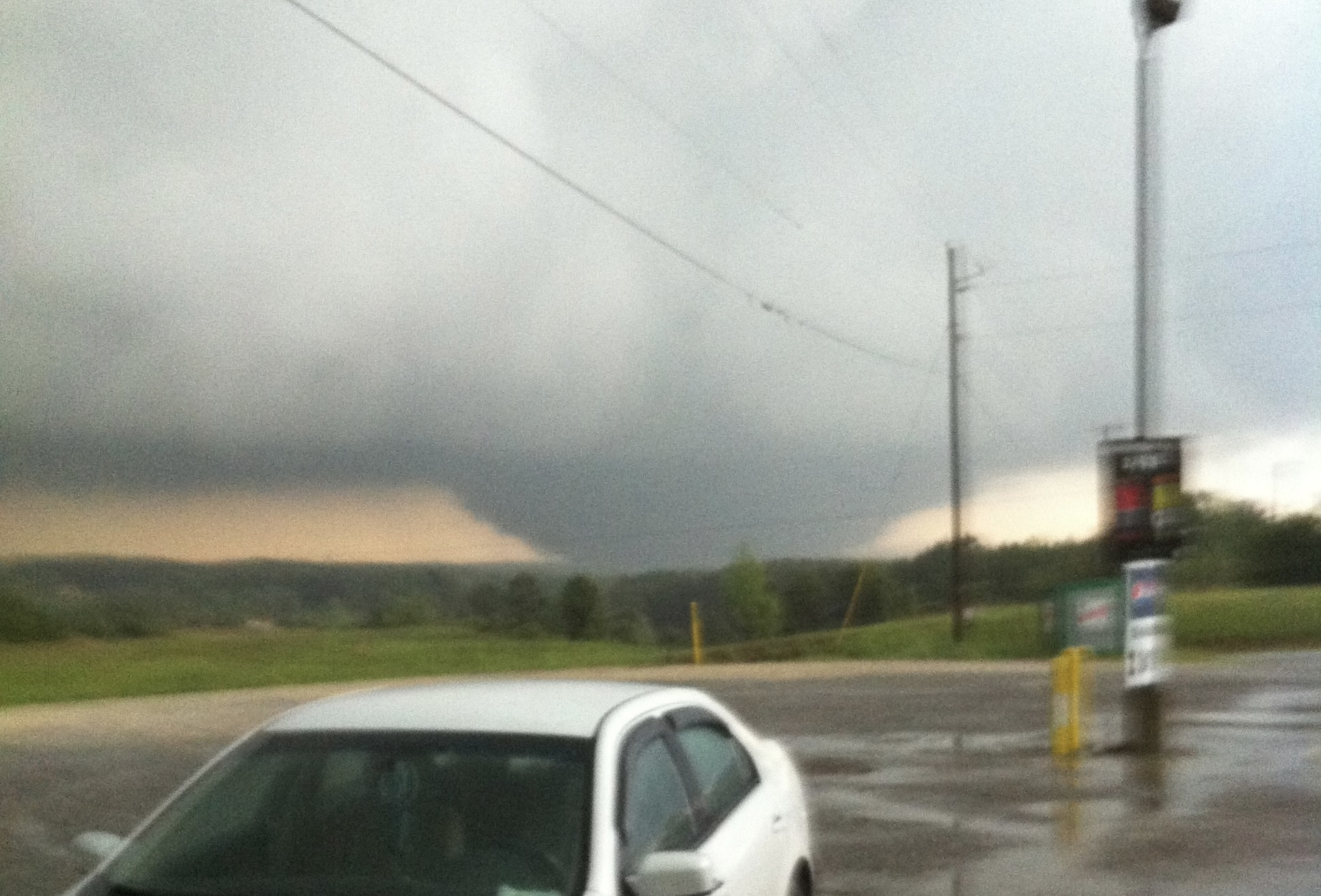
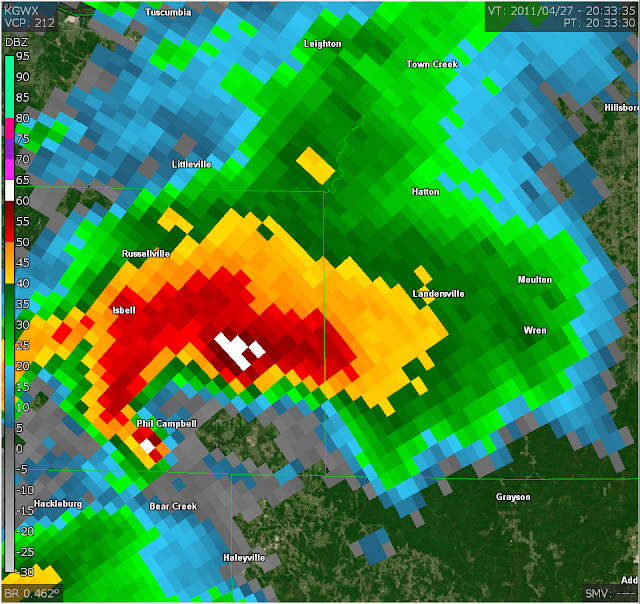
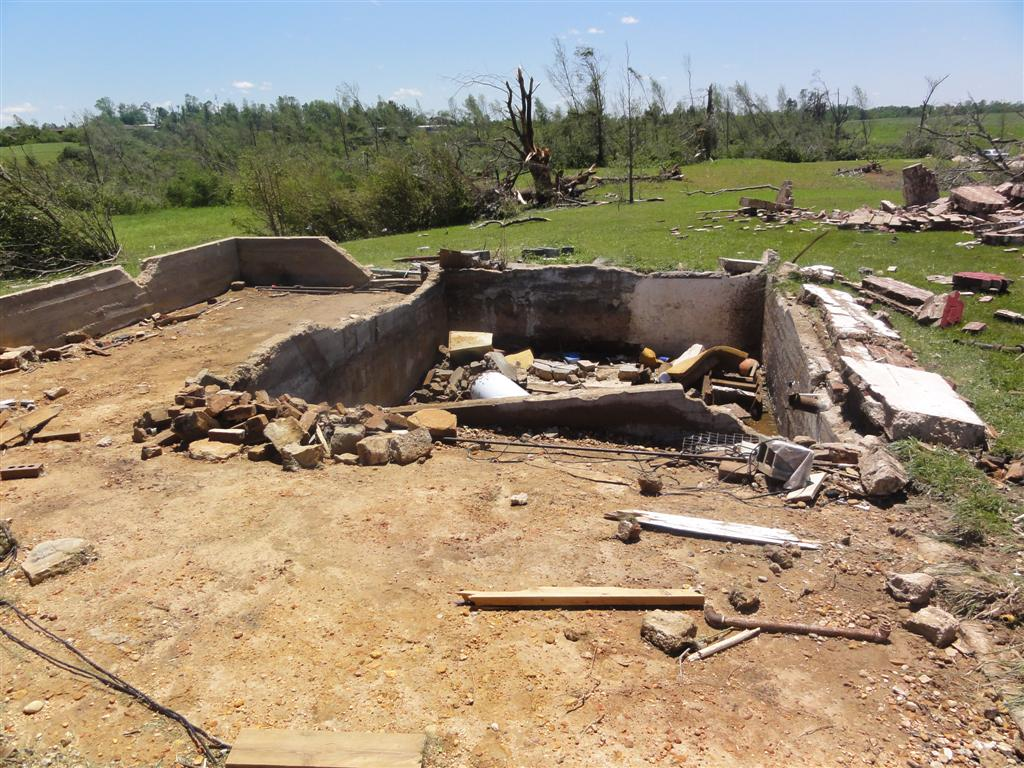
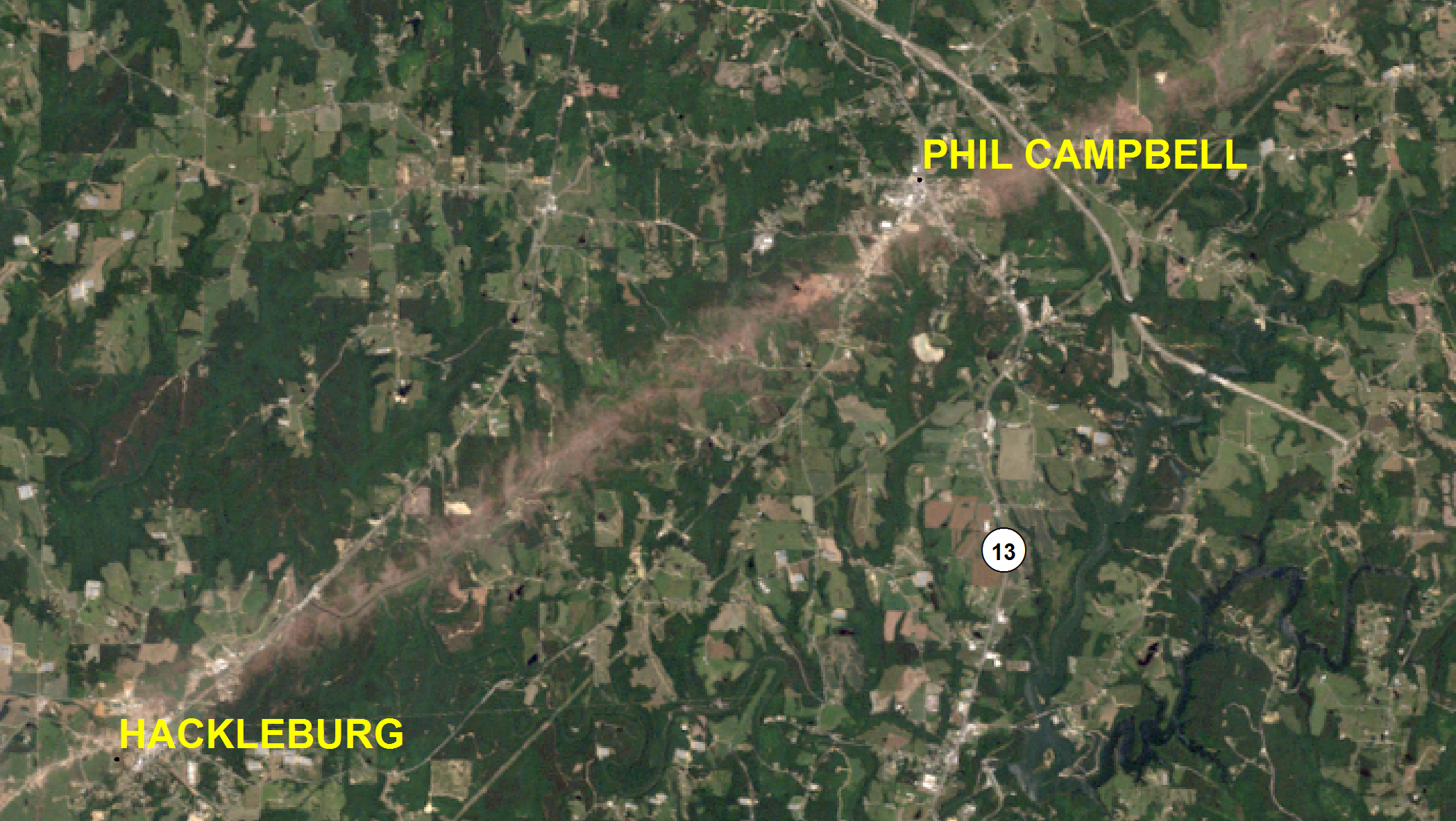
- Clockwise from top: The tornado seen shortly after leaving Phil Campbell; NASA satellite image of the scar left behind by the tornado in Hackleburg and Phil Campbell; EF5 damage to a well-built brick house in Hackleburg; NEXRAD radar image of the tornado just north of Phil Campbell, with a debris ball evident

Meteorological history
- Formed: April 27, 2011, 3:05 p.m. CDT (UTC−05:00)
- Dissipated: April 27, 2011, 4:50 p.m. CDT (UTC–05:00)
- Duration: 1 hour, 45 minutes

EF5 tornado
- on the Enhanced Fujita scale
- Max width: 2,200 yards (1.25 mi; 2.01 km)
- Path length: 102.0 miles (164.15 km)
- Highest winds: 210 mph (340 km/h)

Overall effects
- Fatalities: 71 (Note: The initial results claim 72 fatalities, but this was corrected to 71 after one death of a Phil Campbell resident in Hackleburg was mistakenly counted twice.)
- Injuries: 145+
- Damage: $1.29 billion (2011 USD)
- Areas affected: Hackleburg, Phil Campbell, Tanner, and Harvest, Alabama
- Part of the 2011 Super Outbreak and Tornadoes of 2011

During the afternoon of April 27, 2011, a large, long-lived and deadly EF5 tornado, commonly known as either the Hackleburg tornado or the Phil Campbell tornado, devastated several towns in rural northern Alabama before tearing through the northern suburbs of Huntsville. It was the deadliest tornado of the 2011 Super Outbreak, the largest tornado outbreak in United States history. The second of four EF5 tornadoes to touch down on April 27, along with the Philadelphia, Mississippi, Smithville, Mississippi, and Rainsville, Alabama tornadoes; the tornado reached a maximum width of 1.25 miles (2.01 km) and was estimated to have had peak winds of 210 mph (340 km/h), and a total path length of about 102 miles (164 km), making it the third-longest-tracked tornado of the entire outbreak after the Cordova–Blountsville EF4 tornado and Enterprise, Mississippi, EF4 tornadoes.

The tornado first touched down at 3:05 p.m. CDT (2005 UTC) southwest of Hamilton, Alabama, before quickly becoming violent and reaching EF5 intensity as it approached and struck Hackleburg, destroying a large portion of the town. The tornado maintained EF5 intensity as it struck Phil Campbell, again sweeping numerous homes off foundations, and then peaking in intensity and width shortly afterwards as it entered more rural areas. It weakened somewhat thereafter but re-strengthened as it hit Tanner (previously hit by two F5 tornadoes in the 1974 Super Outbreak). It weakened after hitting Tanner and lifted just south of the Alabama–Tennessee border at 4:50 p.m. CDT (2150 UTC). In total, the tornado was on the ground for nearly two hours, making it the second-longest lived tornado of the outbreak. Hundreds of homes were either destroyed or reduced to foundations as a result of the tornado.

In total, the tornado killed 71 people across five counties. It was the deadliest single tornado ever to strike the state of Alabama as well as the deadliest in the United States since a 1955 tornado in Udall, Kansas killed 80 people – the Joplin EF5 tornado a month later killed 158. The path of the tornado was 102 miles (164 km) long and extended across much of Northern Alabama. Damage wrought by the tornado amounted to $1.29 billion (2011 USD), making it the seventh-costliest tornado in United States history, unaccounted for inflation.

== Meteorological synopsis ==
=== Setup ===
The environmental conditions leading up to the 2011 Super Outbreak were among the "most conducive to violent tornadoes ever documented". On April 25, a vigorous upper-level shortwave trough moved into the Southern Plains states. Ample instability, low-level moisture, and wind shear all fueled a significant tornado outbreak from Texas to Tennessee; at least 64 tornadoes touched down on this day. An area of low pressure consolidated over Texas on April 26 and traveled east while the aforementioned shortwave trough traversed the Mississippi and Ohio River valleys. Another 50 tornadoes touched down on this day. The multi-day outbreak culminated on April 27 with the most violent day of tornadic activity since the 1974 Super Outbreak. Multiple episodes of tornadic activity ensued with two waves of mesoscale convective systems in the morning followed by a widespread outbreak of supercells from Mississippi to North Carolina during the afternoon into the evening.

Tornadic activity on April 27 was precipitated by a 995 mbar (hPa; 29.39 inHg) surface low situated over Kentucky and a deep, negatively tilted (aligned northwest to southeast) trough over Arkansas and Louisiana. A strong southwesterly surface jet intersected these systems at a 60° angle, an ageostrophic flow that led to storm-relative helicity values in excess of 500 m^{2}s^{−2}—indicative of extreme wind shear and a very high potential for rotating updrafts within supercells. Ample moisture from the Gulf of Mexico was brought north across the Deep South, leading to daytime high temperatures of 77 to 81 °F (25 to 27 °C) and dewpoints of 66 to 72 °F (19 to 22 °C). Furthermore, convective available potential energy (CAPE) values reached 2,500–3,000 J/kg.

=== Forecast ===
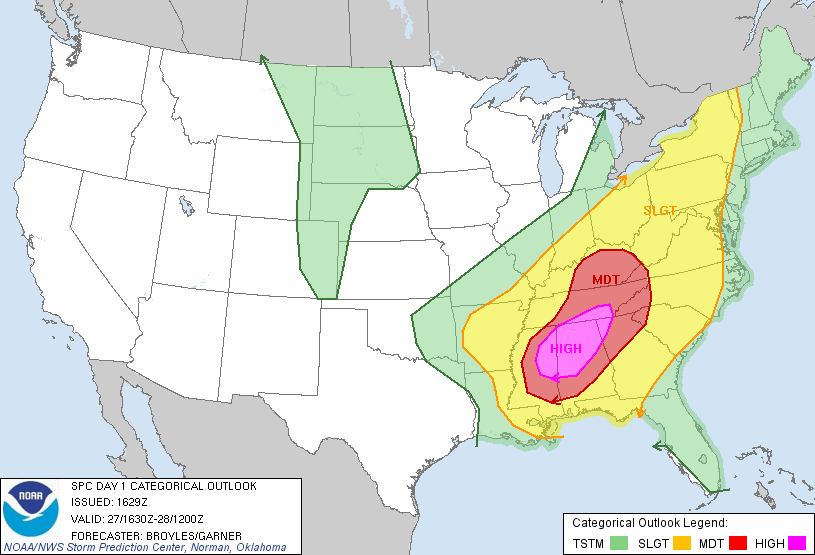
The National Weather Service Storm Prediction Center's Day 1 Convective Outlook for April 27, showing the Categorical Graphic

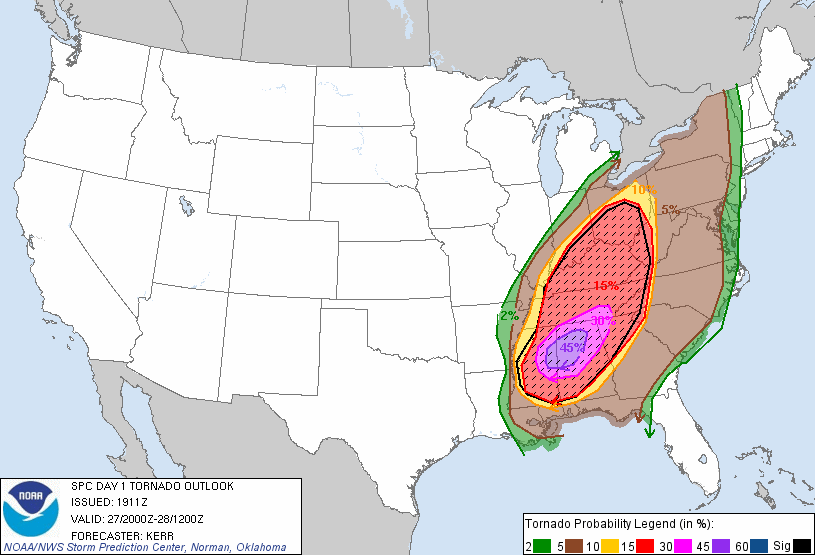
The probability of a tornado within 25 miles of a point (cross-hatched area: 10% or greater probability of EF2+ tornadoes)

On the morning of April 27, a strong cold front with several areas of embedded low pressure extended from the Texas Hill Country northeastward towards the Arklatex and the Ozarks, and later into the lower Ohio Valley. Warm moist air was in place due to strong southerly flow ahead of the front over Mississippi, Alabama, and Tennessee. An upper level disturbance sparked a broad area of showers and thunderstorms as it moved across the frontal boundary on the previous evening. The eastern edge of the line of showers and storms continued to move eastward, in concert with the upper disturbance, reaching the northwest Alabama border around 2:00 a.m. CDT.

This produced the last and most violent round of severe weather, which began around 2:30 p.m. CDT for northern Alabama as supercells began to line up to the southwest of the area. During the early afternoon, the potential for destructive tornadoes was highlighted by the Storm Prediction Center's upgrade to a high risk for severe weather around 1:00 p.m. CDT. This prompted a particularly dangerous situation (PDS) tornado watch, which was issued for northern Alabama and portions of southern Tennessee at 1:45 p.m. CDT. The bulletin that accompanied the watch read:

THE NWS STORM PREDICTION CENTER HAS ISSUED A TORNADO WATCH FOR PORTIONS OF: MUCH OF ALABAMA, NORTHWEST GEORGIA, SOUTHEAST MISSISSIPPI, SOUTHERN MIDDLE TENNESSEE, EFFECTIVE THIS WEDNESDAY AFTERNOON AND EVENING FROM 145 PM UNTIL 1000 PM CDT.

...THIS IS A PARTICULARLY DANGEROUS SITUATION...

DESTRUCTIVE TORNADOES...LARGE HAIL TO 4 INCHES IN DIAMETER. THUNDERSTORM WIND GUSTS TO 80 MPH...AND DANGEROUS LIGHTNING ARE POSSIBLE IN THESE AREAS.

The potential for tornadoes ramped up from noon through 9:00 p.m. CDT. During this period, much of Mississippi and Alabama experienced numerous supercell thunderstorms that produced violent tornadoes, including four EF5 tornadoes, one being the Hackleburg tornado.

== Tornado summary ==
- Damage survey track of this tornado (centermost purple line), as well as the tracks of other EF3+ tornadoes that occurred during 2011 Super Outbreak. (Interactive map, click or tap to view in detail); View mapdata Key EF0 65–85 mph (105–137 km/h); EF1 86–110 mph (138–177 km/h); EF2 111–135 mph (179–217 km/h); EF3 136–165 mph (219–266 km/h); EF4 166–200 mph (267–322 km/h); EF5 ≥201 mph (323 km/h)

=== Formation and track through Hackleburg ===
Deaths in Hackleburg
Name	Age
Bridgett Brisbois	34
Charles Garner	75
Mae Garner	79
Cledis McCarley	69
Chris Dunn	32
Donna Jokela	77
Kaarlo Jokela	76
Ed Hall	53
Faye O'Kelley	70
Freddie Lollie	81
Vicki Lollie	55
John Lynch	70
Ken Vaughn	24
Linda Knight	57
Robbie Cox	68
Teresa Hall	50
Tina Donais	36
Vicky McKee	47

The tornado initially touched down in Marion County, Alabama about 5 miles (8.0 km) west-southwest of Hamilton around 3:05 p.m. CDT and tracked to the northeast, causing significant tree and roof damage. Damage at the beginning of the path ranged from EF1 to EF2. The tornado rapidly intensified and reached EF4 strength as it approached US 43. Along Highway 43, the tornado destroyed several homes and collapsed the exterior walls of a brick residence. The tornado killed one person as it moved over Highway 43 a second time, striking a vehicle and killing the occupant.

As it approached Hackleburg, moving parallel to US 43, the tornado further strengthened to EF5 intensity and widened to 0.75 miles (1.21 km), sweeping away numerous homes along the highway. The tornado moved over populated areas as it entered into the southwestern side of Hackleburg, where a man was killed after refusing to take cover in a storm shelter. A dog that was owned by the man was found over a mile away with serious injuries.

As the tornado impacted Hackleburg, it heavily damaged an elementary and high school, while tearing at least two poorly built concrete storm shelters out of the ground and dislodging the steel door of another. Two occupants of a well-built storm shelter were injured when the tornado tore the door off of its hinges; the home that the shelter rested under was completely destroyed. The tornado dropped a car into the kitchen of another home, but the owner of the home survived.

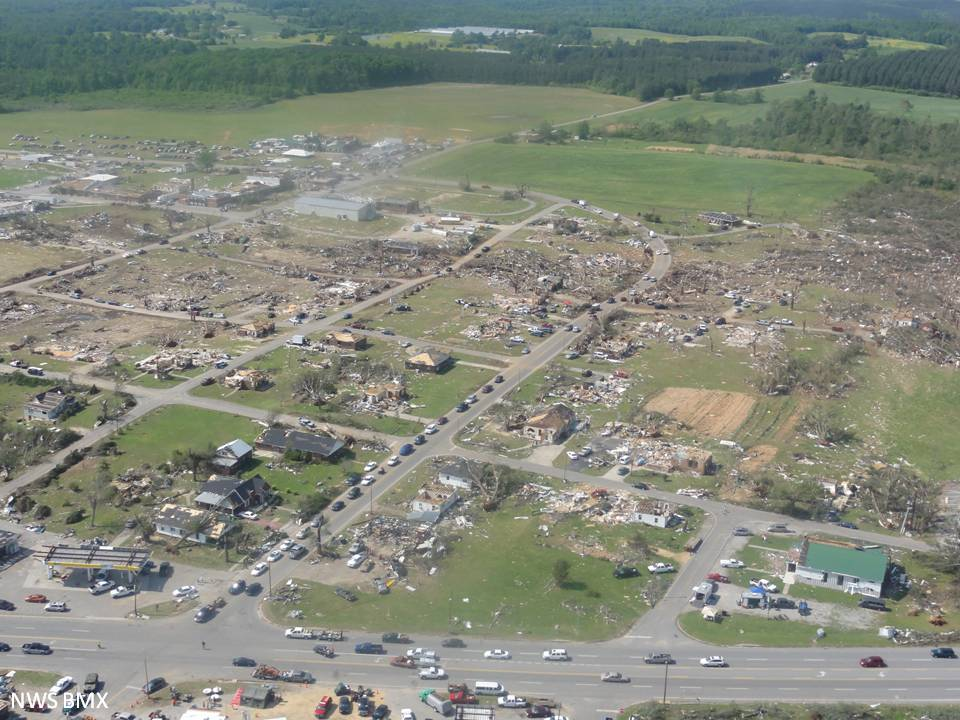
Aerial view of EF5 damage in Hackleburg

The tornado maintained EF5 strength as it struck a Piggly Wiggly grocery store, a shopping center, and a Wrangler Jeans plant, tossing cars as far as 200 yards (180 m) from where they originated. At least one of the homes swept away in Hackleburg was bolted to its foundation, and a brick home in the city's southwest portion had its poured concrete stem walls sheared off at ground level. Extensive wind-rowing of debris was also noted in the area. Jeans from the Wrangler plant reportedly fell from the sky in Courtland, Alabama, roughly 40 miles (64 km) away. Photographs were recovered as far away as Tennessee.

Several buildings in downtown Hackleburg were badly damaged as well. According to the Red Cross, 75% of the town was destroyed. A total of 18 people died in the Hackleburg area. While the damage was initially rated EF3, after further analysis of the damage in and around Hackleburg, the rating was increased to EF5, making it the first F5 or EF5 tornado in Alabama since the 1998 Birmingham tornado. The presence of well-built homes swept away, extensive wind-rowing, and cars thrown hundreds of yards were the main factors that led to the EF5 rating in Hackleburg.

=== Phil Campbell ===
Deaths in Phil Campbell
Name	Age
Donna Berry	52
Nila Black	68
Zan Reese Black	45
Jack Cox	78
Donnie Gentry	63
Patricia Gentry	50
Lester Hood	81
James Keller Jr.	33
Rickey Knox	10
Amy LeClere	33
Jay LeClere	45
Dagmar Leyden	56
Claudia Mojica	38
Edgar Mojica	9
Edna Nix	89
Martha Pace	64
Georgia Scribner	83
Jack Tenhaeff	67
Sonya Trapp	47
Carroll Waller	76
Gerri Waller	64

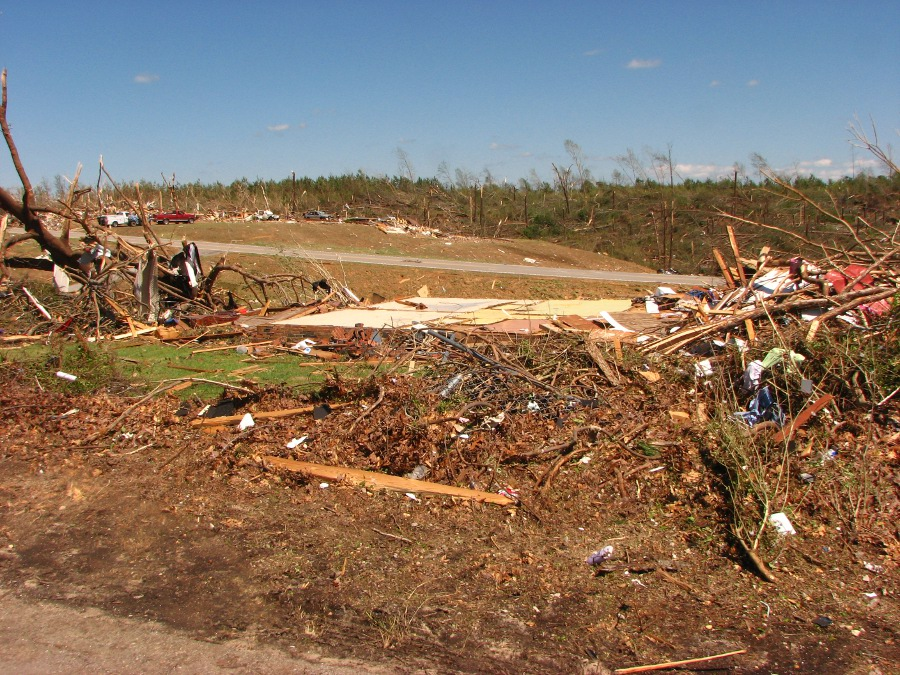
EF5 damage to a well-built home that was swept clean off its foundation in Phil Campbell

The tornado damaged several small homes as it neared the Franklin County line. Eighteen people were killed in the Hackleburg area, and 150 others would sustain various degrees of injuries. The tornado damaged 495 structures along a 25.14-mile (40.46 km) path. At 3:28 p.m. CDT, the tornado crossed into Franklin County, moving to the northeast at an estimated forward speed of 69 miles per hour (111 km/h) while having a maximum width of 2,200 yards (2,000 m). After passing through approximately three miles of vegetation and trees, the tornado crossed Woodward Road, located to the southwest of Phil Campbell. Several homes in the area were completely destroyed, and trees were set aloft by the tornado. The tornado ripped the roof off of another concrete storm shelter as it entered into Phil Campbell, where twenty-one people would be killed. Several homes in Phil Campbell were swept away, some of which even had their block foundations destroyed as well. A 25-foot (7.6 m) section of pavement was scoured from a road in Phil Campbell, with chunks of asphalt scattered up to 1/3 mile (0.54 km) away, and numerous trees were completely denuded and debarked, one of which had a car wrapped around it. Three churches were destroyed, one of which was reduced to a bare slab. Multiple mobile homes were obliterated as well, with their mangled frames tossed up to 50 yards (46 m) away.

=== Peak intensity, Mount Hope to Trinity ===
EF4 and EF5 damage continued as the tornado exited Phil Campbell and tore through rural areas, sweeping away additional homes as it roughly followed County Roads 81 and 82. The tornado then reached its maximum intensity as it tore through the rural community of Oak Grove, with the damage intensity reaching well into the EF5 range and a path width over a mile wide. Oak Grove suffered a large swath of total devastation as large and well-built brick homes with extensive anchoring were swept completely away, with the debris strewn and wind-rowed long distances through nearby fields. A Corvette was thrown 641 feet (195 m) and severely mangled, and a vehicle missing from one residence was never found. A large metal chicken house completely vanished, with nothing recovered at the site but a single piece of metal truss, and numerous large trees in this area were completely debarked. A total of 27 people were killed in Franklin County, mainly in and around Phil Campbell.

The tornado continued into Lawrence County and maintained EF5 strength as it struck the small town of Mount Hope, where significant devastation was incurred to single-family homes and a restaurant. Nothing but the foundation and a pile of debris remained at the restaurant site, and a small portion of the restaurant's foundation slab buckled. Thousands of hardwood and softwood trees were snapped, with a significant number of trees twisted and debarked with only stubs of branches remaining. Many mobile homes were also destroyed with the frames mangled, and a single-family home was completely destroyed, with the walls and contents strewn over a hundred yards. WAAY-TV meteorologist and Mount Hope resident Gary Dobbs spotted the tornado from his front window but was unable to get to his storm shelter because he was giving a live report to viewers of WAAY. While the house was destroyed around him, Dobbs was thrown 40 feet (12 m) from his residence. The door of the storm shelter on the property was torn off, but no friends therein were seriously injured. Dobbs required hospitalization.

Deaths in Lawrence and Morgan counties
Name	Age	Town
Chase Adams	21	Mount Hope, AL
Earl Crosby Sr.	63	Mount Hope, AL
Helen Smith	84	Mount Hope, AL
Horace Smith	83	Mount Hope, AL
J.W. Parker	78	Mount Hope, AL
Allen Terry	49	Mount Moriah, AL
Herman Terry	80	Mount Moriah, AL
Aurelia Guzman	12	Langtown, AL
Lyndon Mayes	74	Langtown, AL
Mary Mayes	76	Langtown, AL
Mike Dunn	58	Langtown, AL
Donald Ray	73	Hillsboro, AL area
Edward Vuknic	66	Hillsboro, AL area
Zora Lee Hale	80	Hillsboro, AL area

Past Mount Hope, the tornado weakened to EF3 strength. More trees were found snapped and twisted before the tornado reached SR 24. At this location, four chicken houses were completely destroyed with much of the debris wrapped around debarked trees. TVA high voltage power line trusses were also destroyed at this location. The tornado continued northeast at EF3 strength as it struck Langtown, where multiple homes lost their roofs or had only interior walls left standing, and a gas station and a store sustained significant damage.

The tornado re-intensified to high-end EF4 strength as it passed northwest of Moulton and Trinity, completely destroying multiple homes and mobile homes. Several cars were tossed into fields and wrapped around debarked trees along County Road 291 and 292. Tree and mobile home damage continued along County Roads 217 and 222, where a handful of large high voltage TVA power poles were destroyed, cutting off electricity delivery from Browns Ferry Nuclear Power Plant. EF4 damage continued northeast towards SR 20, where a restaurant was completely destroyed and two single-family houses were significantly damaged. A total of 14 people were killed in Lawrence County. Tree damage continued into extreme northwestern Morgan County.

The tornado continued a short stretch through the northwest corner of Morgan County, crossing Wheeler Lake, and into Limestone County, coming within approximately 2 miles (3.2 km) of Browns Ferry Nuclear Power Plant and toppling nearly a dozen high voltage power lines in Limestone County, snapping concrete power poles at their bases. These power lines delivered electricity from Browns Ferry Nuclear Power Plant, and without the outlet, the plant had to be shut down. The tornado continued towards the small community of Tanner.

=== Tanner, Limestone County, Harvest and dissipation ===
Tanner experienced a large swath of EF4 damage and a narrow corridor of "high-end EF4 to near-EF5 damage". The storm completely swept away several well-constructed homes with anchor bolting. One home was scattered over 300 yards (270 m) with large items carried completely away. Intense ground scarring occurred in this area. The storm also tossed a large cargo container approximately 600 yards and carried several cars airborne for hundreds of yards. Several homes, a mobile home park, and a church that were destroyed by the 1974 Tanner tornadoes and later rebuilt, were destroyed once again by this tornado.

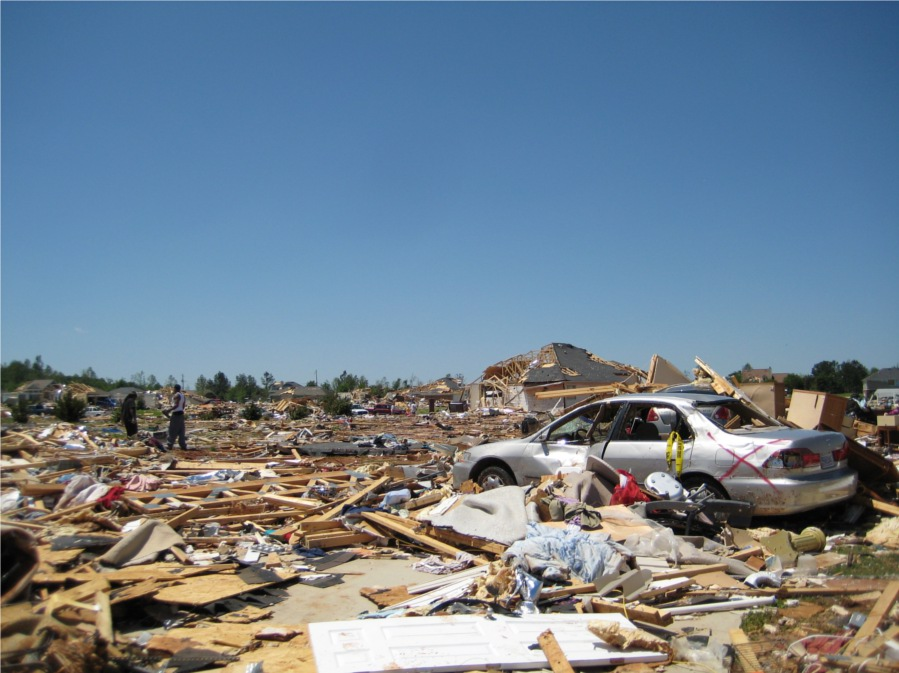
EF3 damage at the Carter's Gin subdivision in Toney

As it crossed US 72 in eastern Limestone County, the tornado destroyed a privately owned radar and tower camera operated by NBC affiliate WAFF and continued into East Limestone, a more populated area of Limestone County where numerous homes were damaged or destroyed, with several leveled at high-end EF3 intensity in a subdivision at the corner of McCulley Mill Road and Capshaw Road. (Imagery from WAFF's radar, as seen during the station's coverage of the tornado outbreak, showed the graphical linear "sweep" indicating the scanning antenna dish briefly swaying violently in a ~70° horizontal curve as the tornado blew the dome and equipment off the radar tower. The tornado was viewed on the camera shortly before it was destroyed.) The tornado then crossed into Madison County, tearing through the suburban communities of Harvest and Toney. Many homes in Harvest were damaged or destroyed, especially in the Anderson Hills subdivision (previously hit by an F4 tornado on May 18, 1995).

Numerous two-story homes were destroyed at that location, with a few that were flattened or reduced to their block foundations. Numerous trees were snapped and debarked, and several mobile homes were swept completely away. The tornado destroyed a Piggly Wiggly grocery store in Harvest, and also severely damaged a convenience store and local bank, which was shut down for months following the event. Damage in Harvest was rated low-end EF4. In Toney, the Carter's Gin subdivision was devastated as multiple poorly anchored homes were leveled at high-end EF3 strength. The tornado then weakened significantly, twisting irrigation equipment and producing only intermittent EF0 tree damage southwest of Hazel Green and through rural areas. The tornado would rapidly weaken after this, with damage being inflicted near the community of Gladstone before dissipating at 4:50 p.m. CDT (21:50 UTC). In all, hundreds of homes received moderate to major damage along the path from Limestone to Madison County with many of these being total losses, and thirteen people were killed.

Overall, the tornado was on the ground for approximately 1 hour and 45 minutes and traveled a total of 102 miles (164 km) across northern Alabama, making it one of the longest tracked of the outbreak. It was initially rated EF3; but on April 30, 2011, after further analysis, it was upgraded to an EF5, being the first EF5 in Alabama since the Birmingham F5 on April 8, 1998.

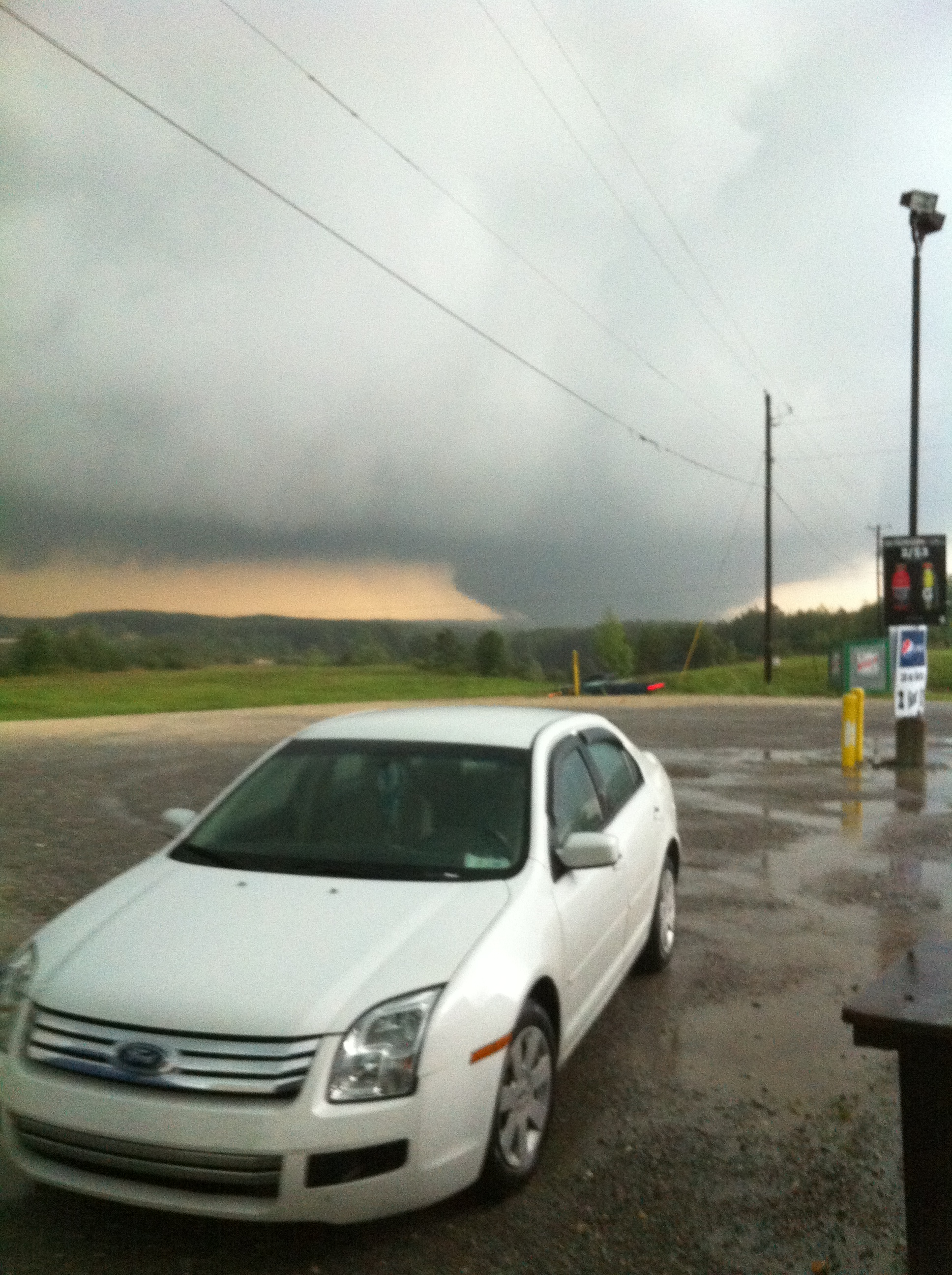
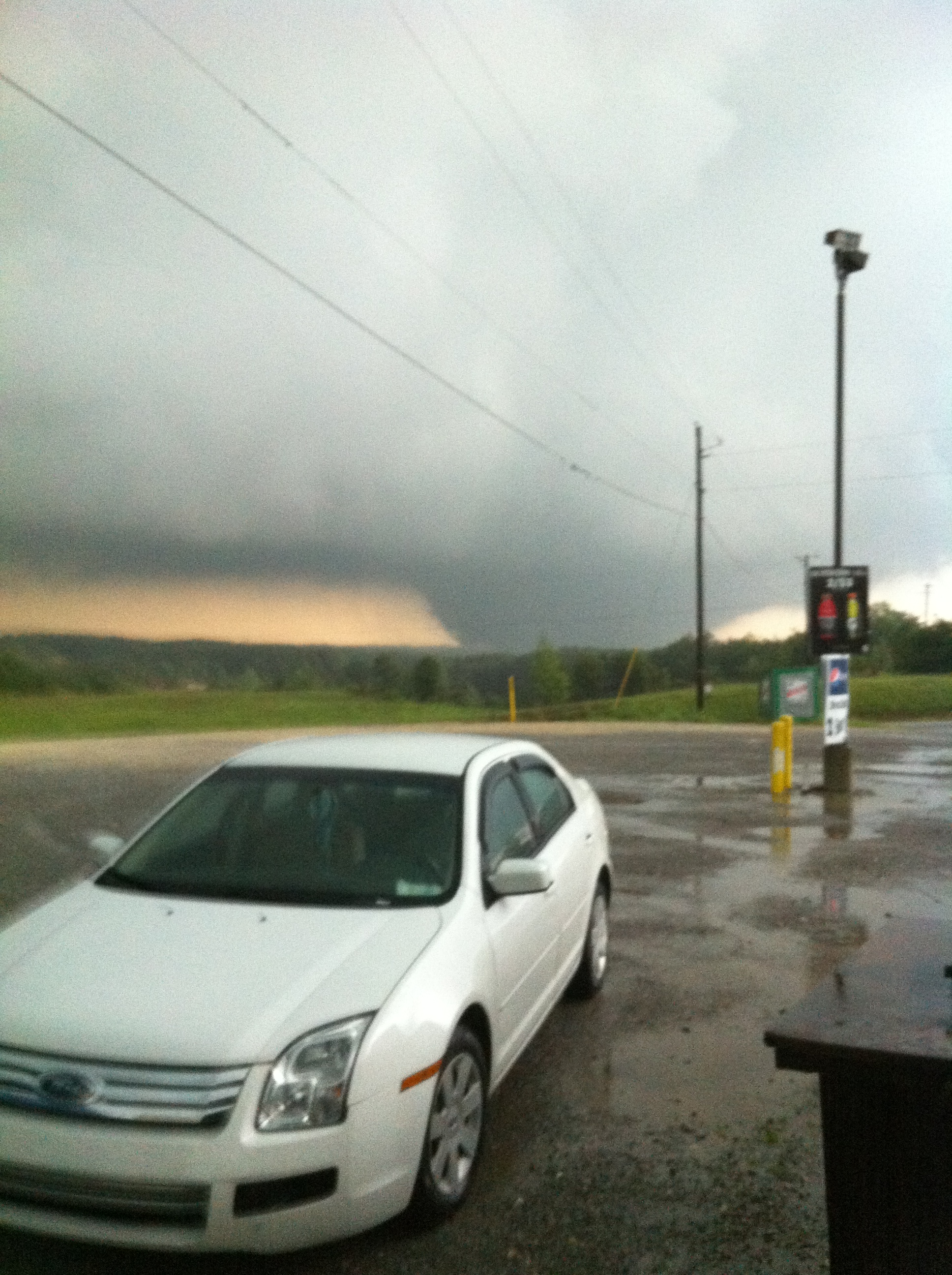
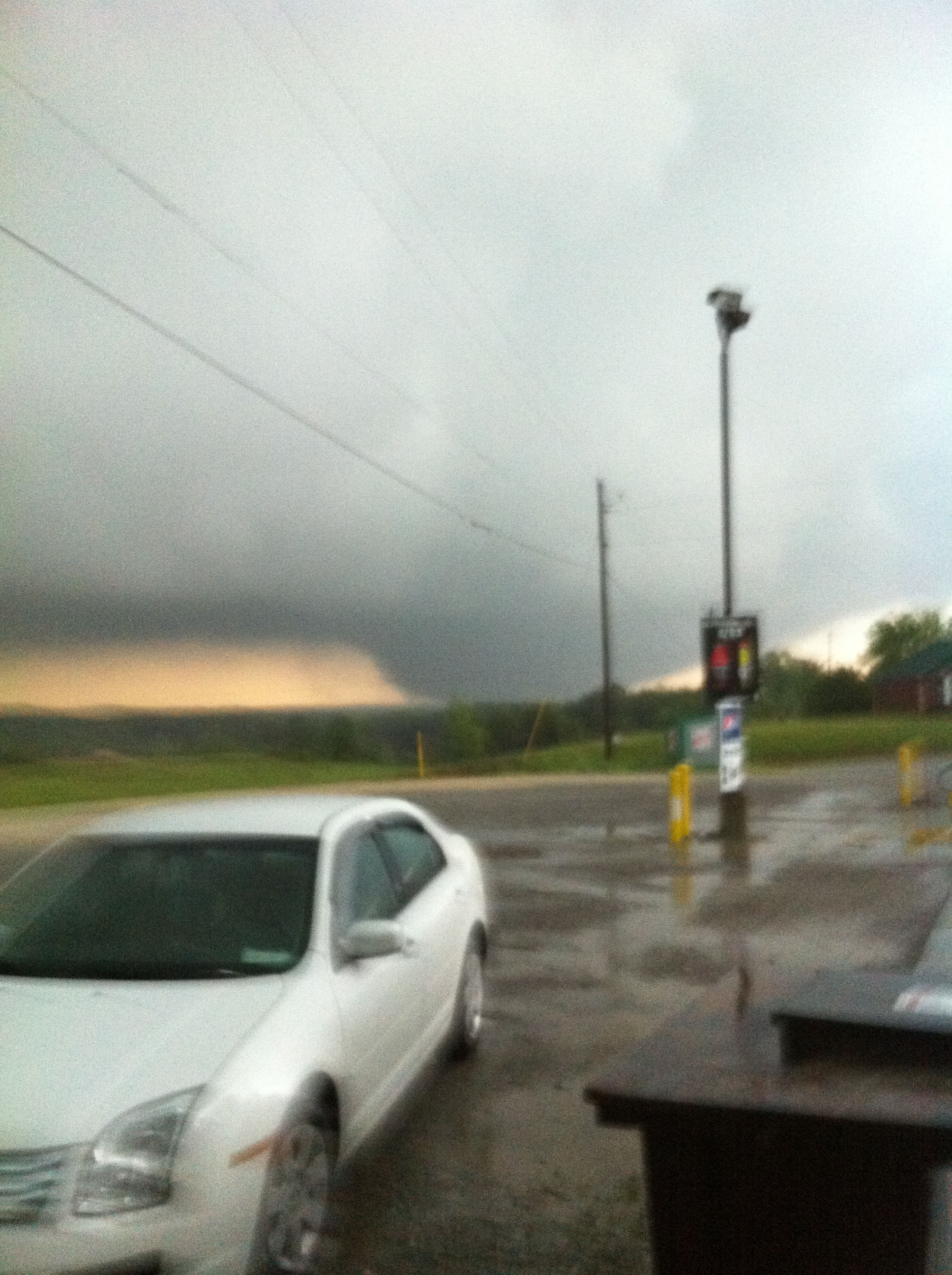
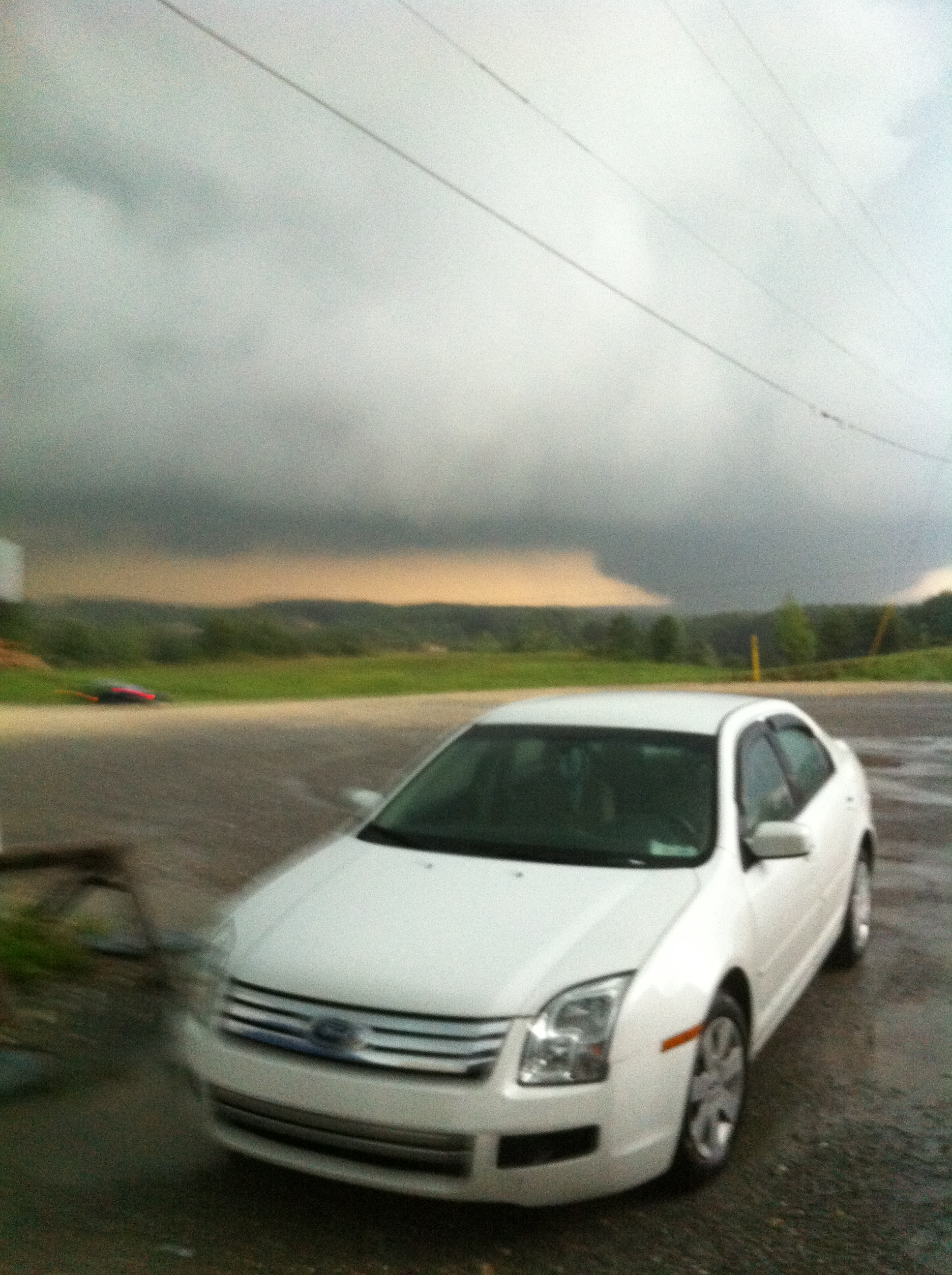
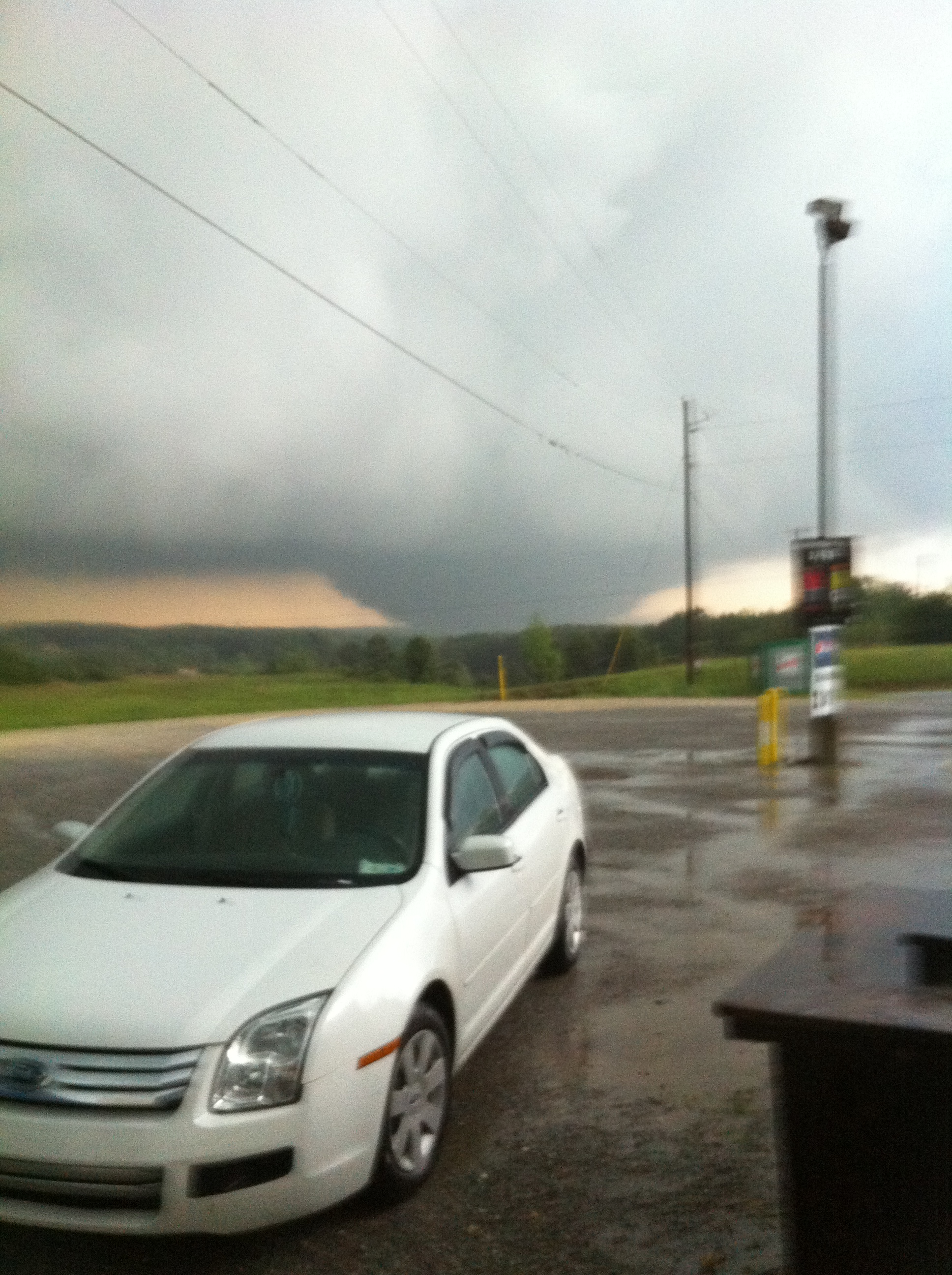
A photo series by a local resident showing the tornado as it tracked between Phil Campbell and Oak Grove.

== Aftermath ==
Damage from the tornado amounted to $1.29 billion (2011 USD), making it one of the costliest tornadoes in U.S. history. This tornado also had the third-longest track of any tornado in the outbreak, with its path extending about 102 miles (164 km) across Northern Alabama. Alabama Governor Robert J. Bentley declared a state of emergency in the state of Alabama on April 27, due to storm damage from severe thunderstorms earlier that day as well as forthcoming severe weather later that day.

Following the tornado outbreak on the evening of April 27, President Barack Obama granted a federal emergency declaration for the state of Alabama, giving federal assistance, including search and rescue assets, to the affected region. More than 2,000 National Guard troops were deployed to Alabama, assisting local and state first responders in search and rescue efforts. President Obama visited the affected areas of Alabama on April 29.

=== Fatalities and damage ===
In total, the tornado killed 71 people, all in Alabama. This made it the deadliest single tornado ever to strike the state of Alabama, as well as the deadliest in the United States since the 1955 Udall, Kansas tornado that killed 80 people, until the 2011 Joplin tornado a month later killed 158.

Debris from the tornado was found in Tennessee, a considerable distance from where the tornado had tracked.

=== "Phil Campbell" meetup ===
In response to the damage in Phil Campbell, one of the hardest hit communities, writer Phil Campbell organized a fundraising and relief effort composed of 20 people with the name Phil Campbell or variations thereof. They traveled to the community from places as far away as Australia to aid in the cleanup effort. Many of these people had planned to attend a convention in June 2011 to commemorate the 100th anniversary of the city's incorporation.

=== 2022 analysis ===
Initially, the tornado was thought to have continued into Tennessee. However, updates to the Damage Assessment Toolkit (DAT) and analysis by damage surveyors, including a 2022 re-analysis of the outbreak by the National Oceanic and Atmospheric Administration (NOAA) and National Severe Storms Laboratory (NSSL), determined that the Hackleburg tornado lifted in Madison County and assessed the portion in Tennessee to be a separate EF3 tornado.

== See also ==
- List of F5, EF5, and IF5 tornadoes
- List of tornadoes in the 2011 Super Outbreak
- 1943 Hackleburg tornado – A violent tornado that also struck Hackleburg, Alabama in 1943.
- Tornado records
