= Belgreen, Alabama =

Unincorporated community in Alabama, United States

- Unincorporated community Census-designated place
- Location of Belgreen in Franklin County, Alabama.
- Coordinates: 34°28′44″N 87°52′23″W
- Country: United States
- State: Alabama
- County: Franklin

Area
  - Total: 1.24 sq mi (3.20 km^{2})
  - Land: 1.23 sq mi (3.18 km^{2})
  - Water: 0.0077 sq mi (0.02 km^{2})
- Elevation: 801 ft (244 m)

Population (2020)
  - Total: 170
  - Density: 138.4/sq mi (53.45/km^{2})
- Time zone: UTC-6 (Central (CST))
  - Summer (DST): UTC-5 (CDT)
- ZIP code: 35653
- Area code: 256
- GNIS feature ID: 2628578

Belgreen is a census-designated place and unincorporated community in Franklin County, Alabama, United States, located nine miles west of Russellville and around 17 miles east of Red Bay on Alabama Highway 24. As of the 2020 census, Belgreen had a population of 170. Belgreen is a small district, composed of a condensed area of residency, the school, and small businesses.

== History ==
Belgreen was the county seat of Franklin County between 1878 and 1891. A post office was established in 1879, but it was later closed. The Franklin County Career Technical Center is now located on the site where the county courthouse and jail once stood. Due to this, the road between the Career Technical Center and the Science Hall of Belgreen High School is named Jail Springs Road. The courthouse and jail existed on this site after the county seat was moved from Frankfort, which is approximately seven miles north of Belgreen. The courthouse complex existed on the current grounds of the Career Technical Center until it burned and was eventually moved to Russellville.

== Demographics ==
Historical population
Census	Pop.	Note	%±
1880	81		—
2010	129		—
2020	170		31.8%
U.S. Decennial Census

Belgreen was listed on the 1880 U.S. census at the time it served as Franklin County Seat. It did not appear again until 2010 when it was listed as a census designated place in the 2010 U.S. census.

Belgreen CDP, Alabama – Racial and ethnic composition Note: the US Census treats Hispanic/Latino as an ethnic category. This table excludes Latinos from the racial categories and assigns them to a separate category. Hispanics/Latinos may be of any race.
Race / Ethnicity (NH = Non-Hispanic)	Pop 2010	Pop 2020	% 2010	% 2020
White alone (NH)	124	166	96.12%	97.65%
Black or African American alone (NH)	0	0	0.00%	0.00%
Native American or Alaska Native alone (NH)	0	0	0.00%	0.00%
Asian alone (NH)	0	0	0.00%	0.00%
Native Hawaiian or Pacific Islander alone (NH)	0	0	0.00%	0.00%
Other race alone (NH)	0	0	0.00%	0.00%
Mixed race or Multiracial (NH)	0	2	0.00%	1.18%
Hispanic or Latino (any race)	5	2	3.88%	1.18%
Total	129	170	100.00%	100.00%

== Belgreen High School ==
Any description of Belgreen would be incomplete without a given history of Belgreen High School, which has existed just south of Alabama Highway 24 for over sixty years.

The story of the naming of Belgreen tells of a young lawyer (who would later become a Franklin County Probate Judge) named Richard S. Watkins. Watkins named the town of Belgreen for a young lady named Belle, whom he was courting at the time. Other sources suggest the name was a purely subjective description of the local geography, constructed from the French word "bel", an adjective meaning "beautiful", and "green". At first, the name was spelled "Bellegreen." The spelling was changed over the years to Bellgreen and later to Belgreen as it is today. Another story recounts that a man named Abner Judd named the town for the beautiful woods and green hillsides in the area.

Between 1878 and 1891, the Franklin County seat was located at Belgreen. A courthouse was built there in 1879 on the site of the present campus of Belgreen High School. The courthouse burned in 1890, which prompted the move of the county seat back to Russellville.

In 1878 or 1879, the first school building was constructed of logs. The seats were made of rough split stumps. This building stood near the present-day intersection of AL HWY 24 and AL HWY 187 where Hester's Store (now defunct) once stood. B.R. Fite was the first official principal of the school. The second site of the school was located east of the present site of Belgreen School. Two large rooms were built there in 1881 with a "Woodmen of the World" meeting room overhead. Nate Redwine served as the principal. The school grew rapidly in the early 1900s. There were so many students that some classes were held at the nearby Methodist Church building and in the old jailhouse located nearby.

Credit is given to Mr. and Mrs. John R. Guin for beginning Belgreen High School. They moved to Belgreen in 1902 and lived in the "old jail" building, adjacent to the site of the former courthouse. Mrs. Guin taught school in her living room in their early years at Belgreen, and later on, she also taught in the upstairs room of the jail. She is called the "mother of Belgreen school" for all of the kind things she did for school students and others in the community. Mrs. Guin also served as the postmaster of the town.

Mr. John R. Guin was a teacher. He went on to serve as superintendent of the Franklin County school system until he retired in 1931. He owned the first car in Belgreen and often lent it to be used as the community school bus.

In 1922 a vocational building was added to the campus. It was replaced in the mid-1960s with a new home economics/agriculture building. The old vocational building was renovated and served as the school's media center until the old main building was demolished and a new building was constructed in 2000.

The first graduation commencement was held at Belgreen in 1925. Around this time, many of the smaller community schools were consolidated or abolished, sending students to join their counterparts at Belgreen.

The original main building was constructed in 1934. This brick veneer building consisted of five classrooms, an auditorium, and two offices (one of which served as the library). Otto Holloway served as the principal. An elementary wing was added to the original building in 1937 which contained eight classrooms over a spacious basement area. This building was nearly identical to the Red Bay High School constructed in 1927. The building was a brick "U," one of the most popular school designs in Alabama at the time. Facing the school, the right wing of the "U" housed the elementary classes while the left wing held the high school. Once inside the school, after going under the stone entryway, the office of the principal was on your immediate left. A small room on the right served as the library. A large auditorium with double wooden seats that could be folded and stored was centrally located between the two wings.

During Talmadge Lee's term as principal in 1940, a brick veneer home economics and agriculture building was constructed.

Belgreen has a state championship basketball team for two years in a row, 1949–1950. During this time, a concrete gymnasium was built across the highway from the main buildings.

Indoor restrooms were first added to the school in 1952 and other improvements were made at that time. A cafeteria was built in 1958 while James Glasgow served as principal.

A tunnel was constructed by the Alabama Highway Department in the early 1960s to allow students a safe route from the main campus to the gymnasium located across the street. Also during the 1960s, additional classrooms were constructed and the gymnasium was renovated and enlarged.

Belgreen High School was accredited by the Southern Association of Schools in 1960. The Franklin County Area Vocational Center, located adjacent to the school's campus, was constructed in 1975 to offer vocational and technical courses for students from all the system's schools.

Graduation of the class of 2001 ended almost 70 years of service for the main building, which was demolished later that year. At that time, construction was begun on a two-level modern building which contains numerous classrooms, offices, and a media center. The graduating class of 2001/2002 attended classes in makeshift buildings without the use of a proper building. Additionally, this class was the first to enter the new building as a student body prior to their graduation ceremonies in May 2002. Students and faculty moved into the new building in October 2002. Four years later, in 2007 a new lunchroom was completed directly in front of the old agricultural and home economics building. Also, a new gymnasium is being constructed next to the old gym and the baseball field, which should be in use in time for the 2007/2008 school year. The current gymnasium will remain standing to be used for practice and physical education class facilities.

== Today ==
Belgreen is now known mostly for the basketball program at the high school, for which the girls' team won a 1A state championship in 2002. The size of Belgreen will be reduced somewhat after the planned addition of a four lane on Alabama Highway 24. The new lane of Highway 24 should cut through the area on the south side of Highway 24 in the only four-way intersection of the town.

What keeps the community of Belgreen alive today is the school and the surrounding area. Belgreen High School received a new state-of-the-art building during the Summer of 2002, which regenerated interest in the area. Also near this condensed area are many well-attended churches, as well as a community fire department house.

The Firehall - Located in close proximity, the firehall is home to the Belgreen Volunteer Fire Department. It also serves as a polling place during elections.

The Underground Lake - Locals tell stories of an underground body of water. Supposedly it is located near Belgreen High School, but there are as many alleged locations as there are people who have supposedly visited the "lake." Purported locations of the "Underground Lake" are under Belgreen High School, "down the road from BHS," etc. The lake, however, is not a myth. People are merely confused as to its real location. It is located under the hill that the Belgreen Church of Christ sits on. It is known for a fact that the entrance is located on a separate, privately owned property. It is also said that fish with no eyes occupy the lake.

The Rock Cut - This is a section of a large rock formation that is cut out, allowing for a smooth transition of Highway 24 from Russellville to Belgreen. It is actually the bottom of an ancient ocean, and the same limestone deposit is quarried elsewhere in the Belgreen area. The "Rock Cut" is a commonly referred to feature in local oral directions. The cut will have to be widened once the new lane of Highway 24 reaches it. It is unique cut from an engineering standpoint, as it is cut so as to allow for a four-way intersection. This gives it a cross-shape, which is obvious when viewed from the air.

Cedar Creek - Cedar Creek is a local body of water that is mostly known as a popular area for bass fishing. It is a part of the Bear Creek lake system, operated by the Tennessee Valley Authority. During the summer, fishing tournaments are held here nearly every weekend.

Glasgow Corners - Glasgow Corners is a local intersection approximately three miles south from the school, which is commonly referenced in many oral directions.

Slickrock - "Slickrock" refers to a number of public facilities provided by TVA around the northern portions of Belgreen along Cedar Creek. Features include a swimming area, a campground, and a boat launch. These locations are usually more popular during the summer, as Cedar Creek is drained by TVA during the cold weather months.

== Notable people ==
- I. T. Quinn, conservationist who served as game commissioner of Alabama and Virginia
- Joshua Heath Scott, founder of JHS Pedals
- Oscar Tompkins, member of the Alabama House of Representatives from Houston County
