= Bear Creek, Alabama =

- Town
- Location in Marion County, Alabama
- Coordinates: 34°16′20″N 87°42′12″W
- Country: United States
- State: Alabama
- County: Marion

Government
  - Type: Mayor-Council
  - Mayor: Rob Taylor

Area
  - Total: 13.76 sq mi (35.6 km^{2})
  - Land: 13.63 sq mi (35.3 km^{2})
  - Water: 0.13 sq mi (0.34 km^{2})
- Elevation: 827 ft (252 m)

Population (2020)
  - Total: 1,047
  - Density: 76.83/sq mi (29.66/km^{2})
- Time zone: UTC-6 (Central (CST))
  - Summer (DST): UTC-5 (CDT)
- ZIP code: 35543
- Area codes: 205 and 659
- FIPS code: 01-04852
- GNIS feature ID: 2405219

Bear Creek is a town in Marion County, Alabama, United States. It incorporated in 1907, although the 1910 U.S. Census records indicated 1909. At the 2020 census, the population was 1,047.

== Geography ==
Bear Creek is located in northeastern Marion County 22 miles (35 km) northeast of Hamilton, the county seat; 9 miles (14 km) east of Hackleburg; 6 miles (10 km) northwest of Haleyville; and 18 miles (29 km) south of Russellville.

According to the U.S. Census Bureau, the town has a total area of 13.8 square miles (36 km^{2}), of which 0.13 square miles (0.34 km^{2}), or 0.97%, are water. The town takes its name from Bear Creek, which flows westerly through the south side of town before turning north and joining the Tennessee River at the Mississippi state line. Upper Bear Creek Reservoir is located in the eastern part of the town. It is a TVA flood-control lake that provides a variety of recreational activities.

== Demographics ==
Historical population
Census	Pop.	Note	%±
1910	214		—
1920	222		3.7%
1930	208		−6.3%
1940	243		16.8%
1950	223		−8.2%
1960	243		9.0%
1970	336		38.3%
1980	353		5.1%
1990	913		158.6%
2000	1,053		15.3%
2010	1,070		1.6%
2020	1,047		−2.1%
U.S. Decennial Census; 2013 Estimate

=== 2020 census ===
As of the 2020 census, Bear Creek had a population of 1,047. The median age was 39.3 years. 24.8% of residents were under the age of 18 and 18.7% were 65 years of age or older. For every 100 females there were 96.8 males, and for every 100 females age 18 and over there were 89.2 males age 18 and over.

0.0% of residents lived in urban areas, while 100.0% lived in rural areas.

There were 403 households in Bear Creek, of which 34.0% had children under the age of 18 living in them. Of all households, 48.4% were married-couple households, 15.9% were households with a male householder and no spouse or partner present, and 28.0% were households with a female householder and no spouse or partner present. About 26.0% of all households were made up of individuals and 13.2% had someone living alone who was 65 years of age or older.

There were 460 housing units, of which 12.4% were vacant. The homeowner vacancy rate was 2.6% and the rental vacancy rate was 3.5%.

Bear Creek racial composition
Race	Num.	Perc.
White (non-Hispanic)	968	92.45%
Black or African American (non-Hispanic)	5	0.48%
Native American	2	0.19%
Asian	4	0.38%
Other/Mixed	31	2.96%
Hispanic or Latino	37	3.53%

=== 2010 census ===
As of the census of 2010, there were 1,070 people, 446 households, and 312 families residing in the town. The population density was 79.3 inhabitants per square mile (30.6/km^{2}). There were 502 housing units at an average density of 37.2 per square mile (14.4/km^{2}). The racial makeup of the town was 97.1% White, 0.1% Black or African American, 0.7% Native American, and 1.2% from two or more races. 1.8% of the population were Hispanic or Latino of any race.

There were 446 households, out of which 26.9% had children under the age of 18 living with them, 52.0% were married couples living together, 12.3% had a female householder with no husband present, and 30.0% were non-families. 25.8% of all households were made up of individuals, and 10.7% had someone living alone who was 65 years of age or older. The average household size was 2.40 and the average family size was 2.87.

In the town, the population was spread out, with 22.9% under the age of 18, 7.6% from 18 to 24, 25.3% from 25 to 44, 28.6% from 45 to 64, and 15.6% who were 65 years of age or older. The median age was 41.1 years. For every 100 females, there were 101.1 males. For every 100 females age 18 and over, there were 104.3 males.

The median income for a household in the town was $25,313, and the median income for a family was $31,364. Males had a median income of $35,938 versus $22,014 for females. The per capita income for the town was $21,959. About 20.0% of families and 28.4% of the population were below the poverty line, including 53.3% of those under age 18 and 4.2% of those age 65 or over.

=== 2000 census ===
As of the census of 2000, there were 1,053 people, 428 households, and 309 families residing in the town. The population density was 78.0 inhabitants per square mile (30.1/km^{2}). There were 475 housing units at an average density of 35.2 per square mile (13.6/km^{2}). The racial makeup of the town was 99.15% White, 0.09% Black or African American, 0.09% Native American, and 0.66% from two or more races. 0.09% of the population were Hispanic or Latino of any race.

There were 428 households, out of which 32.5% had children under the age of 18 living with them, 61.0% were married couples living together, 8.9% had a female householder with no husband present, and 27.6% were non-families. 25.0% of all households were made up of individuals, and 8.9% had someone living alone who was 65 years of age or older. The average household size was 2.46 and the average family size was 2.94.

In the town, the population was spread out, with 24.3% under the age of 18, 8.3% from 18 to 24, 30.4% from 25 to 44, 25.5% from 45 to 64, and 11.6% who were 65 years of age or older. The median age was 37 years. For every 100 females, there were 103.7 males. For every 100 females age 18 and over, there were 102.8 males.

The median income for a household in the town was $27,813, and the median income for a family was $35,341. Males had a median income of $25,000 versus $21,786 for females. The per capita income for the town was $14,917. About 14.6% of families and 18.2% of the population were below the poverty line, including 22.8% of those under age 18 and 32.7% of those age 65 or over. Economic prosperity ended over a decade ago when the manufactured housing business boom began to taper in this railroad town.

== Phillips High School ==
The local high school is Phillips High School, home of the Bears. The original wooden frame school building across the highway from the present location of Phillips School held grades 1-9. This building caught fire around Christmas of 1925. Local churches provided temporary space for the teachers and pupils.

Mrs. John Robert Phillips graciously donated land for a new school on April 16, 1926. Her husband, who died in April 1925, wanted the addition of a high school. The community pulled together with its volunteer labor and donated timber from virgin pines in Bear Creek. Members of the community sacrificed time and money in their participation with the construction of the new Phillips School. Logging was done by wagon and hauled to Veal's sawmill. Brick arrived by rail and was transported by wagon to the site. McKinley Campbell, assisted by his brother, was the contractor for the new facility.

The first graduation was held at Phillips High School in 1929. Agricultural and home economics (aka Family and Consumer Sciences) departments were added in 1935 and housed near the present location of the cafeteria. The football field was located behind the main building, which was later replaced in 1969.

On September 2, 2003, the Phillips football field (James E. Glass Stadium) was named after Coach James E. Glass in honor of the dedication he has given to the football team and school throughout the years. The football field was the first football field in the state of Alabama to be lighted, which took place in the fall of 1933. The original lights brightened the football field until the 2010 season, when a grant for new lights was awarded to both the football and baseball facilities of the school.

Phillips High School has won four state championships in sports. This includes back-to-back state titles in 1985 and 1986 in girls varsity basketball, followed in 2001 by girls volleyball. The She Bear basketball team won the State 1A basketball championship in 2019.
