= Phil Campbell, Alabama =

Town in the United States

- Town
- Flag Seal

- Location of Phil Campbell in Franklin County, Alabama.
- Coordinates: 34°21′07″N 87°42′26″W
- Country: United States
- State: Alabama
- County: Franklin

Area
  - Total: 4.32 sq mi (11.20 km^{2})
  - Land: 4.31 sq mi (11.16 km^{2})
  - Water: 0.015 sq mi (0.04 km^{2})
- Elevation: 1,014 ft (309 m)

Population (2020)
  - Total: 992
  - Density: 230.2/sq mi (88.87/km^{2})
- Time zone: UTC-6 (Central (CST))
  - Summer (DST): UTC-5 (CDT)
- ZIP code: 35581
- Area codes: 205, 659
- FIPS code: 01-59496
- GNIS feature ID: 2407105
- Website: philcampbellal.com

Phil Campbell is a town in Franklin County, Alabama, United States. At the 2020 census, the population was 992. It is one of two towns in Alabama to have the first and last name of an individual; the other being Susan Moore. It is the largest city in southern Franklin County.

== Geography ==
Phil Campbell is located in southeastern Franklin County. Alabama State Route 13 passes through the town, leading north 12 miles (19 km) to Russellville and south 12 miles (19 km) to Haleyville.

According to the U.S. Census Bureau, the town of Phil Campbell has a total area of 4.1 square miles (10.6 km^{2}), of which 0.02 square miles (0.04 km^{2}), or 0.37%, is water.

== Demographics ==
Historical population
| Census | Pop. | Note | %± |
|---|---|---|---|
| 1920 | 418 | | — |
| 1930 | 472 | | 12.9% |
| 1940 | 533 | | 12.9% |
| 1950 | 469 | | −12.0% |
| 1960 | 898 | | 91.5% |
| 1970 | 1,230 | | 37.0% |
| 1980 | 1,549 | | 25.9% |
| 1990 | 1,317 | | −15.0% |
| 2000 | 1,091 | | −17.2% |
| 2010 | 1,148 | | 5.2% |
| 2020 | 992 | | −13.6% |
U.S. Decennial Census; 2013 Estimate

As of the census of 2000, there were 1,091 people, 458 households, and 317 families residing in the town. The population density was 267.4 inhabitants per square mile (103.2/km^{2}). There were 535 housing units at an average density of 131.1 per square mile (50.6/km^{2}). The racial makeup of the town was 98.99% White, 0.27% Native American, 0.18% from other races, and 0.55% from two or more races. 0.82% of the population were Hispanic or Latino of any race.

There were 458 households, out of which 30.8% had children under the age of 18 living with them, 50.4% were married couples living together, 15.7% had a female householder with no husband present, and 30.6% were non-families. 28.8% of all households were made up of individuals, and 15.5% had someone living alone who was 65 years of age or older. The average household size was 2.38 and the average family size was 2.94.

In the town, the population was spread out, with 24.1% under the age of 18, 8.6% from 18 to 24, 26.7% from 25 to 44, 23.2% from 45 to 64, and 17.4% who were 65 years of age or older. The median age was 38 years. For every 100 females, there were 94.1 males. For every 100 females age 18 and over, there were 84.0 males.

The median income for a household in the town was $24,598, and the median income for a family was $30,221. Males had a median income of $24,219 versus $17,316 for females. The per capita income for the town was $16,053. About 14.2% of families and 20.2% of the population were below the poverty line, including 27.9% of those under age 18 and 19.2% of those age 65 or over.

=== 2010 census ===
As of the census of 2010, there were 1,148 people, 497 households, and 325 families residing in the town. The population density was 280 inhabitants per square mile (110/km^{2}). There were 580 housing units at an average density of 141.4 per square mile (54.6/km^{2}). The racial makeup of the town was 95.2% White, .2% African American, 0.4% Native American, 3.0% from other races, and 1.2% from two or more races. 4.0% of the population were Hispanic or Latino of any race.

There were 497 households, out of which 23.9% had children under the age of 18 living with them, 46.3% were married couples living together, 14.5% had a female householder with no husband present, and 34.6% were non-families. 30.2% of all households were made up of individuals, and 12.8% had someone living alone who was 65 years of age or older. The average household size was 2.31 and the average family size was 2.88.

In the town, the population was spread out, with 21.9% under the age of 18, 9.2% from 18 to 24, 22.4% from 25 to 44, 28.9% from 45 to 64, and 17.6% who were 65 years of age or older. The median age was 42.8 years. For every 100 females, there were 88.8 males. For every 100 females age 18 and over, there were 89.4 males.

The median income for a household in the town was $24,886, and the median income for a family was $36,250. Males had a median income of $25,625 versus $34,583 for females. The per capita income for the town was $14,174. About 23.3% of families and 25.7% of the population were below the poverty line, including 26.1% of those under age 18 and 10.5% of those age 65 or over.

== Town history ==
In the 1880s, a railroad work crew leader and engineer by the name of Phillip Campbell (originally from England) established a work camp. Mel Allen, a prominent local businessman, told Campbell that if he would construct a railroad depot and add a side track to the stretch of railroad going through the area, Allen could develop a town, which he would name after Campbell. Campbell built both the depot and siding, and Allen followed through on his promise. Phil Campbell is one of only two towns in Alabama given both the first and last names of an individual - the other is Susan Moore.

In June 1995 the Brooklyn writer Phil Campbell organized a convention in this town for people with the name "Phil Campbell". Twenty-two Phil Campbells and one Phyllis Campbell attended; they hailed from all over the United States. The article about the Phil Campbell convention was published in Might magazine, a San-Francisco-based publication founded by writer Dave Eggers. The essay was later included in Might's anthology, Shiny Adidas Tracksuits and the Death of Camp, and the convention was mentioned by Ripley's Believe it or Not! A second "Phil Campbell Day" was organized the following year, but it was not as well attended. Phil Campbell's city hall maintains a file of all the Phil Campbells who visit and check in.

=== Tornado ===
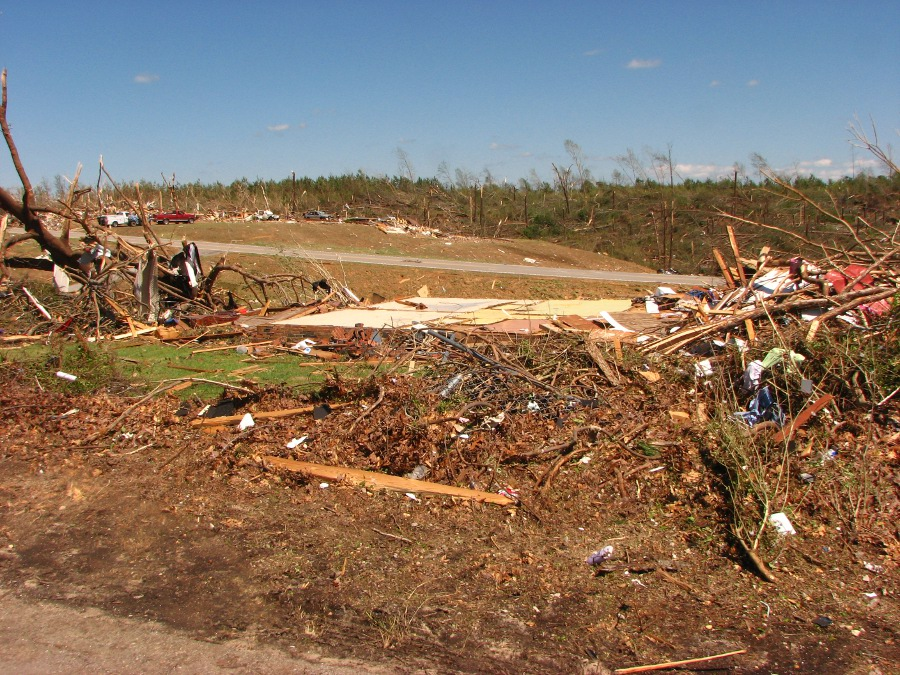
EF5 damage from the April 2011 tornado

On April 27, 2011, the town suffered extensive damage from a very large and swift-moving tornado. The tornado was rated EF5 with estimated winds of 210 mph. The tornado damaged many buildings in and around the main part of town. Twenty-seven people in Phil Campbell died in the event. A reporter stated that the town may never be able to recover from the tornado because the damage was so extensive.

Phil Campbell, an Ohio-born writer who settled in Brooklyn, New York, was planning another namesake convention for June 2011. After the tornado, he converted his organizing to a relief effort. He called on the Phil Campbells of the world and other supporters to unite under the slogan, "I'm with Phil". He set up a website for people to donate money to help repair houses in two areas of the town, in addition to assisting in the repair of the high school and city hall. Attendees at the convention later traveled to the town to assist the local community in rebuilding. Andrew Reed, a resident of the town, directed a documentary about the Campbells' relief effort called I'm With Phil.

The town was also affected by an F2 tornado on April 3, 1974.

== Town council ==
The members of the city council are Danny Brown, Lynn Landers, Roy Nagle, Eddie Barton, and Jim Cartee. The mayor of Phil Campbell is Steve Bell.

== Phil Campbell High School ==
The first school in Phil Campbell was a two-story frame building constructed in 1910. It was located at the back of the Phil Campbell Methodist Church. The school was subsequently destroyed by fire.

The second school was constructed in 1915 and was located at the site of the present school on Alabama State Route 13 in Phil Campbell. This school was a small wooden building and was also destroyed by fire, on Christmas Day, 1924. During the next two years, classes were held in local church buildings, the town's former bank building, and the U.S. Post Office building located near the railroad. Graduation services for the first accredited Phil Campbell High School class were conducted in 1926 in the Phil Campbell Methodist Church. The class had nine graduating members.

The third Phil Campbell school was completed in 1926. It had a main classroom building and a vocational school. After the main building was destroyed by fire in 1954, the present school buildings were constructed.

After the 2011 tornado, the damaged high school was torn down. A new school was completed and opened in September 2014.

Sports

The boys basketball team won the state title in 1947, defeating Scottsboro 23-21. It was the last year that the state of Alabama had a single classification for basketball.

The Bobcats defeated Bayside Academy 5-0 in Game 1 and 7-6 in Game 2 claiming their first baseball state title in school history. They finished the 2021 season with an impressive 41-6 record.

== Local features ==
The town was incorporated in 1911, 15 years after it was founded. The town has a total of three traffic lights.

Every summer Phil Campbell hosts an annual celebration, the Downtown Hoedown (formerly Phil Campbell Day). The celebration features carnival rides, car shows, and arts-and-crafts items for sale. Local bands and singers perform in the evening. Beginning in 2010, there was a 5k-road race called the Hoedown Hustle (in 2013 renamed the Judy James Memorial, a benefit for pancreatic cancer), and a 1-mile fun run.

The town is home to a campus of Northwest-Shoals Community College (the state's first junior college). Before Christmas every year, students from NWSCC perform The Legend of Toyland. This is a live choreographed performance set to pre-recorded narration. It has been produced for more than 25 years. Schools from surrounding counties bring students to watch the performance. Lanny McAlister (music director at NWSCC) is credited with the creating the production and directing it since then.

Phil Campbell is also home to Dismals Canyon, a privately owned, natural conservatory that has been designated a National Natural Landmark by the National Park Service. Dismals Canyon features a natural swimming pool, natural shelters used by various Native American tribes for more than 10,000 years, nature trails, rare luminous insects, and natural rock formations.

== Notable people ==
- Tonto Coleman, coach and commissioner of the Southeastern Conference
- Johnny Mack Morrow, member of the Alabama House of Representatives 1990-2018
- Billy Sherrill, record producer and arranger

== See also ==
Other American cities with a personal name and surname as the municipal name:

- Albert Lea, Minnesota
- Carol Stream, Illinois
- George West, Texas
- Jim Thorpe, Pennsylvania
- Maxbass, North Dakota
