= Hackleburg, Alabama =

- Town
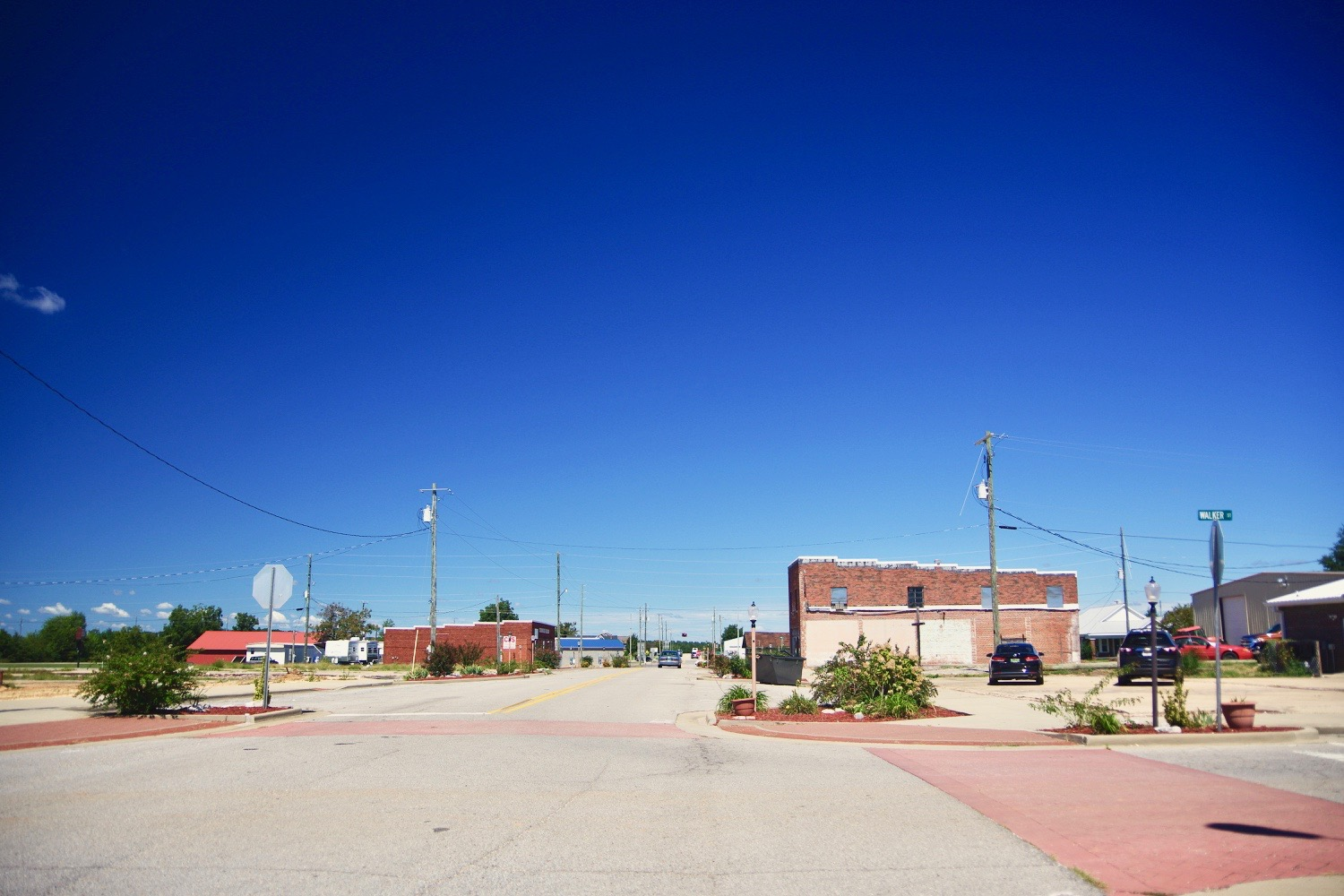
- Main Street

- Location in Marion County, Alabama
- Coordinates: 34°16′10″N 87°49′50″W
- Country: United States
- State: Alabama
- County: Marion

Area
  - Total: 15.29 sq mi (39.6 km^{2})
  - Land: 15.28 sq mi (39.6 km^{2})
  - Water: 0.01 sq mi (0.026 km^{2})
- Elevation: 889 ft (271 m)

Population (2020)
  - Total: 1,425
  - Density: 93.29/sq mi (36.02/km^{2})
- Time zone: UTC-6 (Central (CST))
  - Summer (DST): UTC-5 (CDT)
- ZIP code: 35564
- Area codes: 205, 659
- FIPS code: 01-32560
- GNIS feature ID: 2406635
- Website: townofhackleburg.com

Hackleburg is a town in Marion County, Alabama, United States. It incorporated on August 23, 1909. At the 2020 census, its population was 1,425, down from 1,516 at the 2010 census.

== History ==
Hackleburg developed in the early 19th century as a stop along Jackson's Military Road. It was named by the early drovers of sheep who passed through the region while en route to market in Tuscumbia, and whose sheep encountered a thorny plant growing in abundance in that area and known locally by the name hack burrs (often corrupted to "hack berries") and which same plants were often fatal to sheep, besides being destructive to their wool. A post office opened in the town in 1885.

Hackleburg incorporated in 1909 following the construction of a branch line of the Illinois Central Railroad through the area. Hackleburg marks the highest point (some 931 feet above sea level) along the route connecting Miami, Florida with Chicago, Illinois. In 2025, the people of Hackleburg voted to allow alcohol sales within the city limits, joining Hamilton, Guin, and Winfield as the fourth "wet" city in Marion County.

=== 2011 tornado ===
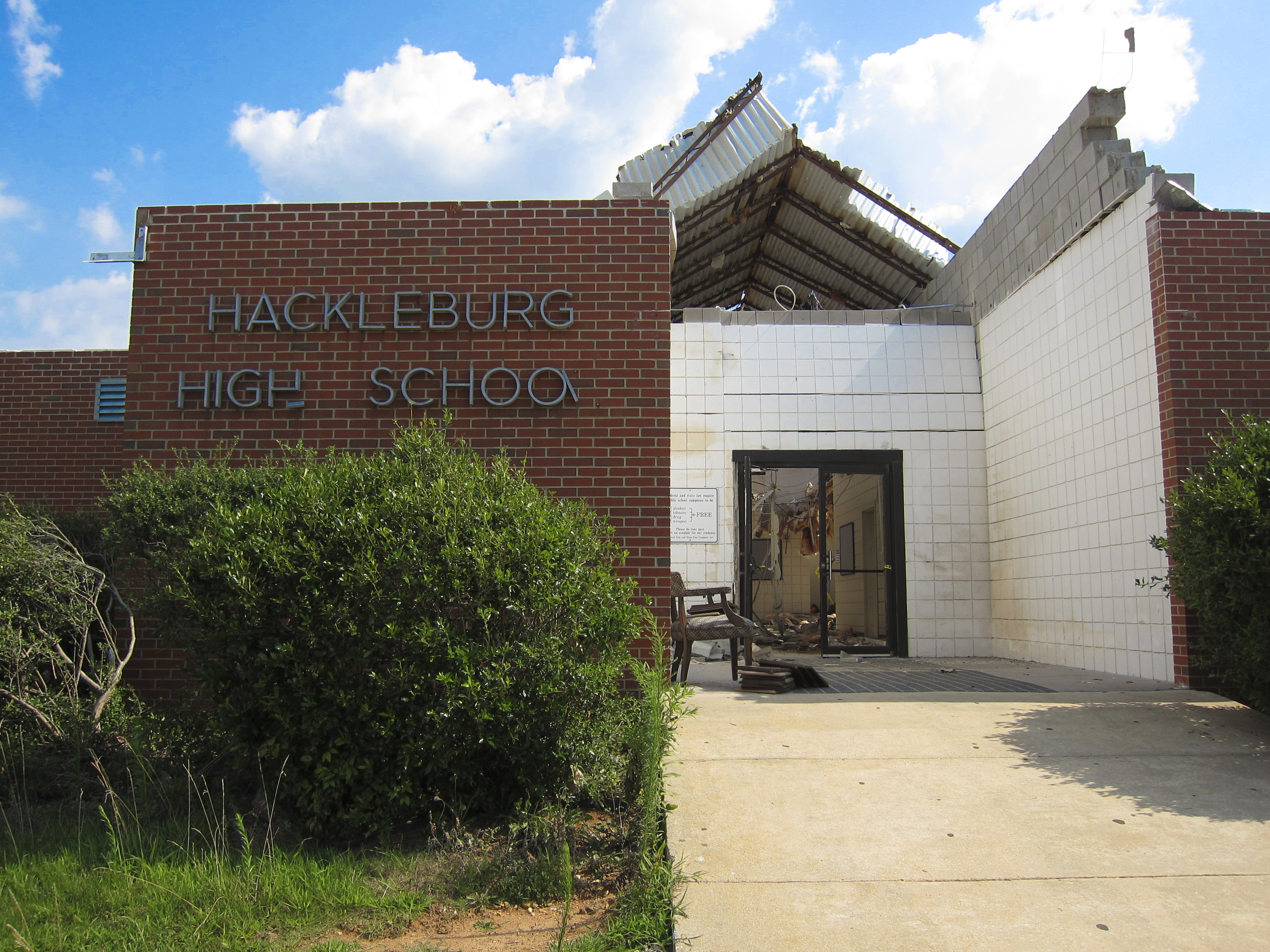
Hackleburg High School damaged by the tornado

On April 27, 2011, Hackleburg suffered catastrophic damage when it was hit by an EF5 tornado – part of the 2011 Super Outbreak. Eighteen Hackleburg residents died in the storm. On May 2, the Red Cross declared that 75 percent of the city had been destroyed. Many people rebuilt here, although 2017 population estimates showed a slight decline from 2010.

== Geography ==
Hackleburg is located in northern Marion County. U.S. Route 43 and Alabama State Route 172 intersect in the center of town. US 43 connects the town with Russellville 18 miles (29 km) to the north and Hamilton, the Marion county seat, 14 miles (23 km) to the southwest.

Dismals Canyon, a National Natural Landmark, is located 4 miles (6 km) northeast of Hackleburg. According to the U.S. Census Bureau, the town has a total area of 15.3 square miles (40 km^{2}), of which 0.01 square miles (0.03 km^{2}), or 0.07%, are water. The town center is on the Tennessee Valley Divide (watershed), with half of the town draining north toward Bear Creek, a tributary of the Tennessee River, and half draining south to tributaries of Clifty Creek, part of the Tombigbee River basin.

== Demographics ==
Historical population
Census	Pop.	Note	%±
1910	286		—
1920	376		31.5%
1930	628		67.0%
1940	492		−21.7%
1950	534		8.5%
1960	527		−1.3%
1970	726		37.8%
1980	883		21.6%
1990	1,161		31.5%
2000	1,527		31.5%
2010	1,516		−0.7%
2020	1,425		−6.0%
U.S. Decennial Census

=== Racial and ethnic composition ===
Hackleburg town, Alabama – Racial and ethnic composition Note: the US Census treats Hispanic/Latino as an ethnic category. This table excludes Latinos from the racial categories and assigns them to a separate category. Hispanics/Latinos may be of any race. Race and ethnicity were not reported in Alabama for populations under 2,500 in 1980 and under 1,000 in 1990.
Race / Ethnicity (NH = Non-Hispanic)	Pop 1990	Pop 2000	Pop 2010	Pop 2020	% 1990	% 2000	% 2010	% 2020
White alone (NH)	1,158	1,512	1,476	1,315	99.74%	99.02%	97.36%	92.28%
Black or African American alone (NH)	0	2	1	4	0.00%	0.13%	0.07%	0.28%
Native American or Alaska Native alone (NH)	1	1	3	3	0.09%	0.07%	0.20%	0.21%
Asian alone (NH)	1	0	0	4	0.09%	0.00%	0.00%	0.28%
Native Hawaiian or Pacific Islander alone (NH)	x	0	0	0	x	0.00%	0.00%	0.00%
Other race alone (NH)	0	0	7	0	0.00%	0.00%	0.46%	0.00%
Mixed race or Multiracial (NH)	x	8	10	47	x	0.52%	0.66%	3.30%
Hispanic or Latino (any race)	1	4	19	52	0.09%	0.26%	1.25%	3.65%
Total	1,161	1,527	1,516	1,425	100.00%	100.00%	100.00%	100.00%

=== 2020 census ===
As of the 2020 census, Hackleburg had a population of 1,425. The median age was 42.4 years. 21.9% of residents were under the age of 18 and 20.0% were 65 years of age or older. For every 100 females, there were 93.1 males, and for every 100 females age 18 and over, there were 92.6 males age 18 and over.

0.0% of residents lived in urban areas, while 100.0% lived in rural areas.

There were 634 households in Hackleburg, of which 30.9% had children under the age of 18 living in them. Of all households, 44.6% were married-couple households, 20.2% were households with a male householder and no spouse or partner present, and 29.5% were households with a female householder and no spouse or partner present. About 31.9% of all households were made up of individuals, and 16.5% had someone living alone who was 65 years of age or older.

There were 697 housing units, of which 9.0% were vacant. The homeowner vacancy rate was 0.0% and the rental vacancy rate was 6.3%.

=== 2010 census ===
At the 2010 census there were 1,516 people, 656 households, and 433 families in the town. The population density was 99.8 inhabitants per square mile (38.5/km^{2}). There were 769 housing units at an average density of 50.3 per square mile (19.4/km^{2}). The racial makeup of the town was 97.7% White, 0.1% Black or African American, 0.2% Native American, 1.0% from other races, and 1.1% from two or more races. 1.3% of the population were Hispanic or Latino of any race.

Of the 656 households 26.1% had children under the age of 18 living with them, 50.3% were married couples living together, 11.9% had a female householder with no husband present, and 34.0% were non-families. 30.5% of households were one person and 17.7% were one person aged 65 or older. The average household size was 2.31 and the average family size was 2.83.

The age distribution was 20.5% under the age of 18, 8.8% from 18 to 24, 21.1% from 25 to 44, 28.4% from 45 to 64, and 21.1% 65 or older. The median age was 44.7 years. For every 100 females, there were 89.3 males. For every 100 females age 18 and over, there were 89.5 males.

The median household income was $29,350 and the median family income was $34,375. Males had a median income of $27,426 versus $24,625 for females. The per capita income for the town was $16,584. About 27.4% of families and 31.1% of the population were below the poverty line, including 51.3% of those under age 18 and 18.5% of those age 65 or over.

=== 2000 census ===
At the 2000 census there were 1,527 people, 657 households, and 444 families in the town. The population density was 99.7 inhabitants per square mile (38.5/km^{2}). There were 737 housing units at an average density of 48.1 per square mile (18.6/km^{2}). The racial makeup of the town was 99.21% White, 0.13% Black or African American, 0.07% Native American, 0.07% from other races, and 0.52% from two or more races. 0.26% of the population were Hispanic or Latino of any race. Of the 657 households 28.9% had children under the age of 18 living with them, 54.3% were married couples living together, 9.6% had a female householder with no husband present, and 32.4% were non-families. 29.5% of households were one person and 16.6% were one person aged 65 or older. The average household size was 2.32 and the average family size was 2.88.

The age distribution was 23.2% under the age of 18, 7.3% from 18 to 24, 27.1% from 25 to 44, 25.7% from 45 to 64, and 16.6% 65 or older. The median age was 40 years. For every 100 females, there were 90.4 males. For every 100 females age 18 and over, there were 89.3 males.

The median household income was $26,075 and the median family income was $30,938. Males had a median income of $26,542 versus $20,739 for females. The per capita income for the town was $17,239. About 10.8% of families and 14.8% of the population were below the poverty line, including 13.2% of those under age 18 and 25.8% of those age 65 or over.

== Education ==
Hackleburg is a part of the Marion County Schools.

Hackleburg Elementary and High School's mascot is the Panther, and the school colors are Black and Gold. The schools were among the many buildings destroyed by the tornado of April 27, 2011.

The Marion County Board of Education initiated construction of a $25 million total K-12 academic complex in Hackleburg. It opened for the 2015–2016 school year.

== Athletics ==
The 2003 and the 2004 Hackleburg High School baseball teams finished as runners-up in the Alabama High School Athletic Association state baseball tournament. The 2007 Hackleburg High School baseball team won the 1A State Championship in the Alabama High School Athletic Association state baseball tournament. It marked the first state championship in the school's history. In December 2009 the High School football team became 1A State runners-up in the AHSAA football championship losing to the Brantley Bulldogs.

== Notable people ==
- Sonny James, Country Music Hall of Fame singer
- Charles Moore, civil rights photojournalist
- Gary Palmer, congressman

== See also ==
- 1943 Hackleburg tornado
