= Jayden Loving =

American football player (born 2003)

No. 91 – Chicago Bears
- Position: Defensive tackle
- Roster status: Active

Personal information
- Born: April 8, 2003 (age 23); Hamilton, Alabama, U.S.
- Listed height: 6 ft 1 in (1.85 m)
- Listed weight: 309 lb (140 kg)

Career information
- High school: Hamilton (Hamilton, Alabama)
- College: Bethune–Cookman (2021–2022); Western Kentucky (2023–2024); Wake Forest (2025)
- NFL draft: 2026: undrafted

Career history
- Chicago Bears (2026–present)
- Stats at Pro Football Reference

Jayden Loving (born April 8, 2003) is an American professional football defensive tackle for the Chicago Bears of the National Football League (NFL). He played college football for the Bethune–Cookman Wildcats, Western Kentucky Hilltoppers and Wake Forest Demon Deacons.

== Early life ==
Loving was born on April 8, 2003, and grew up in Hamilton, Alabama, raised by his mother. He first played football around age seven. attended Hamilton High School where he competed in football, basketball and track. For a year, he was unable to play football due to a hip tumor, which he recovered from. Playing defensive end, he was a second-team all-state performer in his senior year, 2021. Loving was a zero-star recruit and committed to play college football for the Bethune–Cookman Wildcats.

== College career ==
Loving redshirted as a true freshman at Bethune–Cookman in 2021, playing two games, before playing in 11 games in 2021 while posting 37 tackles, seven tackles-for-loss (TFLs) and 4.5 sacks. He then transferred to the Western Kentucky Hilltoppers in 2023 and appeared in 13 games while recording 36 tackles, three TFLs and two sacks. Due to a knee injury, he only made five appearances in 2024, tallying nine tackles and a half-sack. Loving transferred to the Wake Forest Demon Deacons for his final season in 2025. In his lone year with Wake Forest, he played in 13 games, three as a starter, while making 44 tackles, 8.5 TFLs and 2.5 sacks.

== Professional career ==
Pre-draft measurables
Height	Weight	Arm length	Hand span	Wingspan	40-yard dash	10-yard split	20-yard split	20-yard shuttle	Three-cone drill	Vertical jump	Broad jump	Bench press
6 ft 1 3/8 in (1.86 m)	309 lb (140 kg)	30 1/4 in (0.77 m)	9 3/8 in (0.24 m)	6 ft 5 3/8 in (1.97 m)	4.82 s	1.64 s	2.78 s	4.53 s	7.15 s	35.0 in (0.89 m)	9 ft 3 in (2.82 m)	33 reps
All values from Pro Day

After going unselected in the 2026 NFL draft, Loving signed with the Chicago Bears as an undrafted free agent. In preseason, he recorded four tackles, a sack and two pass deflections. Loving made the Bears' 53-man roster for the 2026 season.
