= All Souls' Day =

Day for commemoration of all the faithful departed

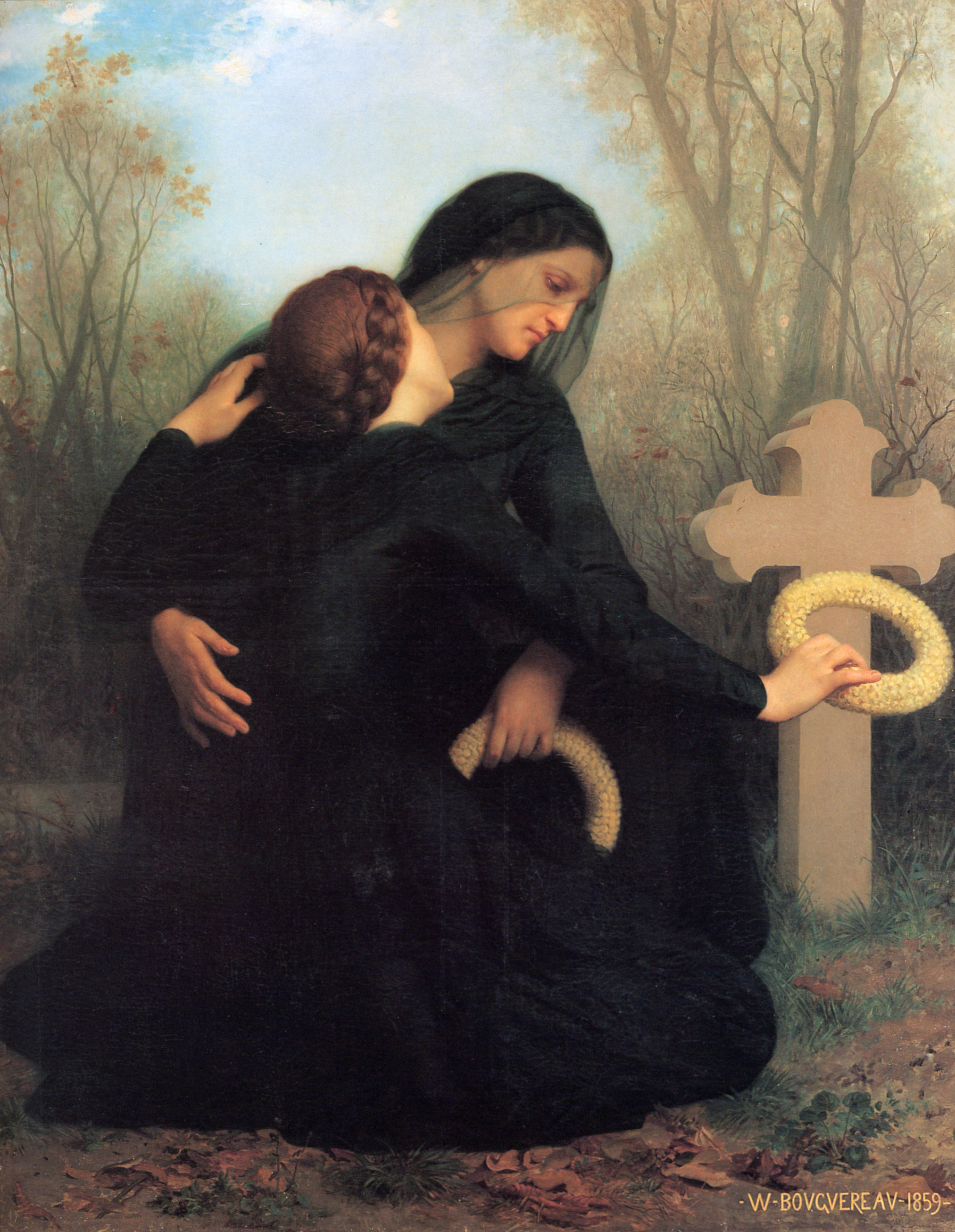
- All Souls' Day by William-Adolphe Bouguereau
- Also called: Feast of All Souls; Defuncts' Day; Day of Remembrance; Commemoration of all the faithful departed
- Observed by: Catholicism; Eastern Orthodoxy; Lutheranism; Anglicanism; Methodism; Other Protestant denominations
- Liturgical color: Black, where it is tradition (otherwise violet or purple)
- Type: Christian
- Significance: For the souls of all the faithful departed
- Observances: Prayer for the departed; visits to cemeteries; decking of graves; special pastries and food
- Date: 2 November
- Frequency: Annual
- Related to: Saturday of Souls; Thursday of the Dead; Day of the Dead; All Saints' Day; Samhain; Totensonntag; Blue Christmas

All Souls' Day (Note: also known as the Commemoration of all the Faithful Departed) is a day of prayer and remembrance for the faithful departed, observed by Christians on 2 November. In Western Christianity, including Roman Catholicism, Evangelical-Lutheranism and parts of Anglicanism, All Souls' Day is the third day of Allhallowtide, after All Saints' Day (1 November) and All Hallows' Eve (31 October). Before the standardization of Western Christian observance on 2 November by St. Odilo of Cluny in the 10th century, many Roman Catholic congregations celebrated All Souls' Day on various dates during the Easter season as it is still observed in the Eastern Orthodox Church, the Eastern Catholic churches and the Eastern Lutheran churches. Churches of the East Syriac Rite (Assyrian Church of the East, Ancient Church of the East, Syro-Malabar Catholic Church, Chaldean Catholic Church, Syriac Catholic Church) commemorate all the faithful departed on the Friday before Lent.

As with other days of the Allhallowtide season, popular practices for All Souls' Day include attending Mass offered for the souls of the faithful departed, as well as Christian families visiting graveyards in order to pray and decorate their family graves with garlands, flowers, candles and incense. Given that many Christian cemeteries are interdenominational in nature, All Souls' Day observances often have an ecumenical dimension, with believers from various Christian denominations praying together and cooperating to adorn graves.

== In other languages ==
Known in Latin as Commemoratio Omnium Fidelium Defunctorum, All Souls' Day is known

- in other Germanic languages as Allerseelen (German), Allerzielen (Dutch), Alla själars dag (Swedish), and Alle Sjæles Dag (Danish);
- in the Romance languages as Dia de Finados or Dia dos Fiéis Defuntos (Portuguese), Commémoration de tous les fidèles Défunts (French), Día de los Fieles Difuntos (Spanish), Commemorazione di tutti i fedeli defunti (Italian), and Ziua morților or Luminația (Romanian);
- in the Slavic languages as Wspomnienie Wszystkich Wiernych Zmarłych or Zaduszki (Polish), Vzpomínka na všechny věrné zesnulé, Památka zesnulých or Dušičky (Czech), Pamiatka zosnulých or Dušičky (Slovak), Spomen svih vjernih mrtvih (Croatian), and День всех усопших верных or День поминовения всех усопших (Den' vsekh usopshikh vernykh; Den' pominoveniya vsekh usopshih) (Russian)
- in the Baltic languages: Vėlinės or Visų Šventųjų Diena
- in Hungarian: Halottak napja
- and in Welsh: Dygwyl y Meirw, lit. 'Feast of the Dead'.

== Background ==
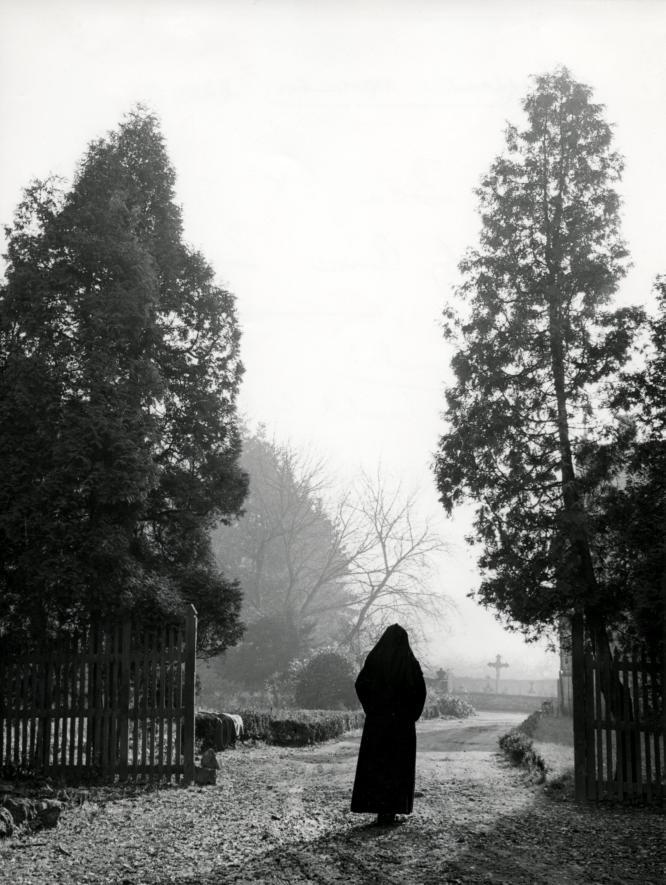
Nun visiting a graveyard at All Souls' Day

In Evangelical-Lutheranism and Anglicanism, "the faithful" refers to "all true believers on earth and in heaven, both living and dead" and during Allhallowtide, the "faithful departed" (the Church Triumphant) are revered (cf. communion of saints). In Evangelical Lutheranism, "the whole people of God in Christ Jesus" are seen as saints and All Souls' Day commemorates those believers who have died as the 'faithful departed'.

In the Roman Catholic Church, "the faithful" refers essentially to baptized Catholics; "all souls" commemorates the church penitent of souls in purgatory, whereas "all saints" commemorates the church triumphant of saints in heaven. In the liturgical books of the Latin Church it is called the Commemoration of All the Faithful Departed (Latin: Commemoratio omnium fidelium defunctorum). The Catholic Church teaches that the purification of the souls in purgatory can be assisted by the actions of the faithful on earth. Its teaching is based also on the practice of prayer for the dead mentioned as far back as 2 Maccabees 12:42–46. The theological basis for the feast is the doctrine that the souls which, on departing from the body, are not perfectly cleansed from venial sins, or have not fully atoned for past transgressions, are debarred from the Beatific vision, and that the faithful on earth can help them by prayers, alms, deeds, and especially by the sacrifice of the Holy Mass.

The United Protestant tradition emphasizes "the Christian belief in bodily resurrection and eternal life" in observances of All Souls' Day.

All Souls' Day is seen by many Christian leaders are one in which ecumenism is celebrated, given that believers from various denominations collectively visit Christian cemeteries that are interdenominational in nature. Christians from the Catholic, Lutheran, Reformed, Anglican, Methodist and Baptist denominations often come together to clean, repair and then decorate graveyards together. The use of candles by Christians symbolized the light of Christ and the use of lamps at the tombs of Christian martyrs dates back to the early Christian period. Ecumenical prayer services are often held at Christian cemeteries on All Souls' Day.

== Observance by Christian denomination ==
=== Western Christianity ===
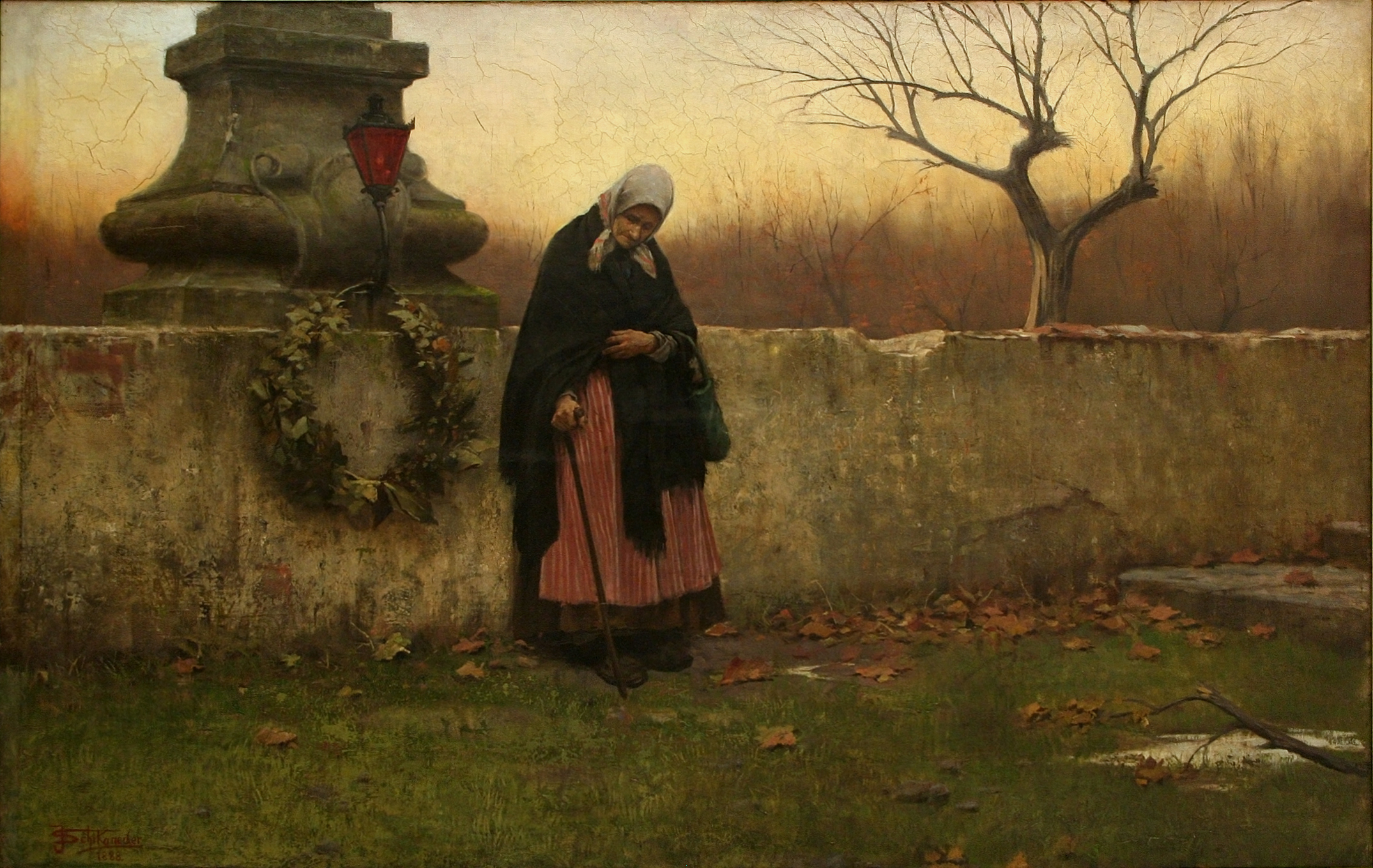
All Souls' Day, painting by Jakub Schikaneder, 1888

==== History ====
In Western Christianity, there is ample evidence of the custom of praying for the dead in the inscriptions of the catacombs, with their constant prayers for the peace of the souls of the departed and in the early liturgies, which commonly contain commemorations of the dead. Tertullian, Cyprian and other early Western Fathers witness to the regular practice of praying for the dead among the early Christians.

The offering of the Mass at Engelbrekt Church (Evangelical-Lutheran) in Lärkstaden on All Souls' Day; the painting above the high altar depicts the communion of saints.

In the sixth century, it was customary in Benedictine monasteries to hold a commemoration of the deceased members at Whitsuntide. In the time of St. Isidore of Seville (d. 636) who lived in what is today Spain, the Monday after Pentecost was designated to remember the deceased. At the beginning of the ninth century, Abbot Eigil of Fulda set 17 December as commemoration of all deceased in part of what is today Germany.

According to Widukind of Corvey (c. 975), there also existed a ceremony praying for the dead on 1 October in Saxony. But it was the day after All Saints' Day that Saint Odilo of Cluny chose when in the 11th century he instituted for all the monasteries dependent on the Abbey of Cluny an annual commemoration of all the faithful departed, to be observed with alms, prayers, and sacrifices for the relief of the suffering souls in purgatory. Odilo decreed that those requesting a Mass be offered for the departed should make an offering for the poor, thus linking almsgiving with fasting and prayer for the dead.

The 2 November date and customs spread from the Cluniac monasteries to other Benedictine monasteries and thence to the Western Church in general. The Diocese of Liège was the first diocese to adopt the practice under Bishop Notger (d. 1008). 2 November was adopted in Italy and Rome in the thirteenth century.

In the 15th century the Dominicans instituted a custom of each priest offering three Masses on the Feast of All Souls. During World War I, given the great number of war dead and the many destroyed churches where Mass could no longer be said, Pope Benedict XV, granted all priests the privilege of offering three Masses on All Souls' Day.

Throughout Christendom, especially in Roman Catholic and Evangelical-Lutheran countries, families attend church and visit the graves of their departed family members on All Souls Day, which are decorated with flowers and candles. These preceding days of Allhallowtide are often used to decorate the graves as a token of paying respect to the faithful departed. On the night between All Saints' Day and All Souls' Day, in Brittany, a traditional custom has been the custom of four people who take turns ringing church bells and chanting "Christians awake, pray to God for the souls of the dead, and say the Pater and Ave for them." Those Christians in their homes replied with an "Amen" and commenced praying for the dead. On All Souls' Eve, Christians in Brittany attend Vespers in church and then visit churchyards, where candles are placed on all the graves. Young men in the Île de Sein take turns to ring the church bells every hour on All Souls' Day, in memory of the faithful departed; in Germany the church bells are rung at noon on All Souls' Day. In Poland, Christian families make Wypominki—paper sheets with black borders on which the names of their dead family members are written. These are read as families pray together during the month of November, and on the Sundays in November, Christians bring Wypominki to their churches, where these names are read from the pulpit, with the assembly offering prayers for them. In Europe, families make and eat special food on All Souls' Day, which is typically lentils or beans; this food is also donated to the poor.

==== Roman Catholicism ====
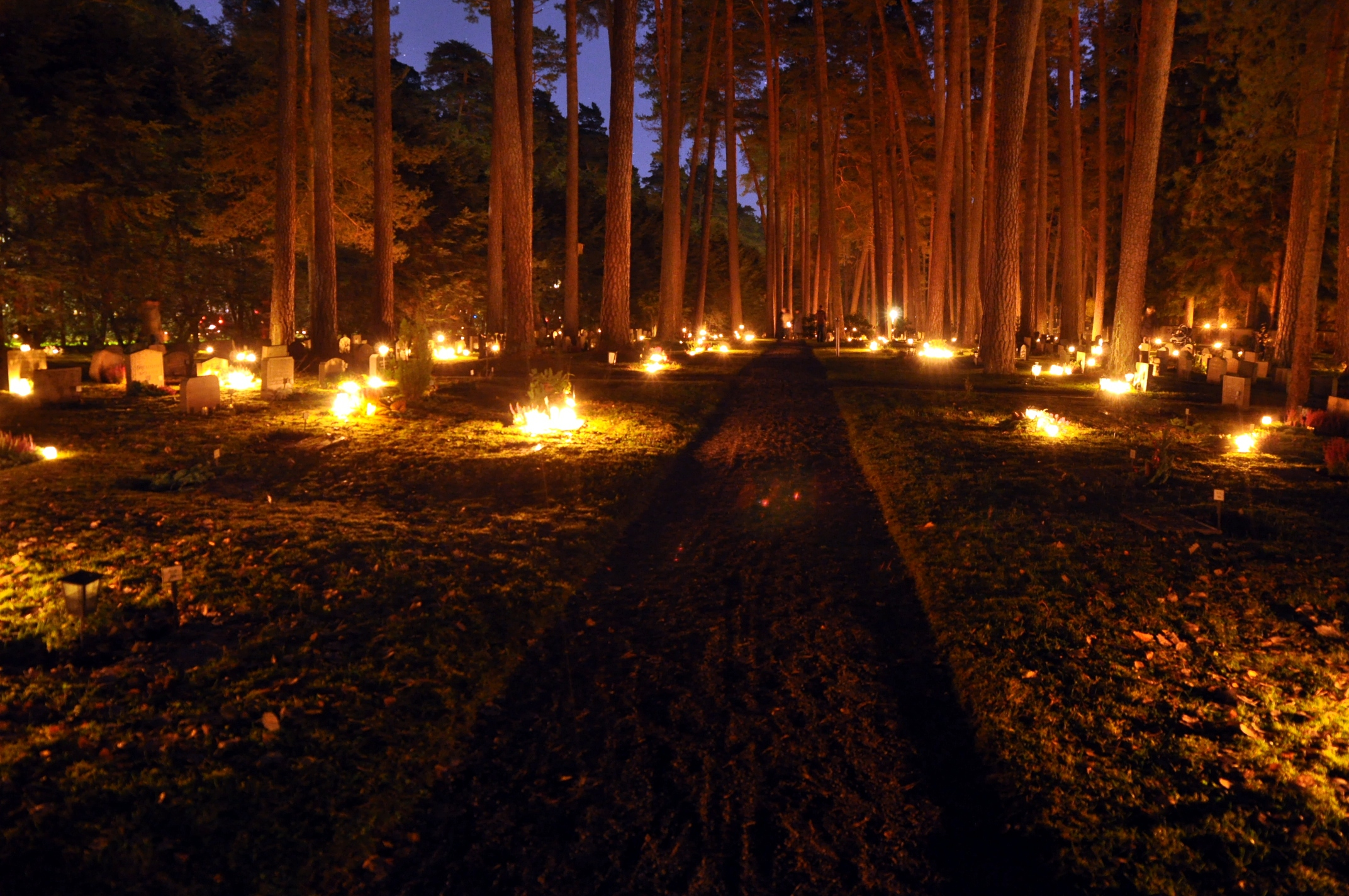
All Saints' Day at Skogskyrkogården in Stockholm. The graves are lighted with votive lights.

If 2 November falls on a Sunday, All Souls' Day is observed on that day. In the Liturgy of the Hours of All Souls' Day, the sequence Dies irae can be used ad libitum. Every priest is allowed to celebrate three holy Masses on All Souls' Day.

In Divine Worship: The Missal, used by members of the Anglican Ordinariates, the minor propers (Introit, Gradual, Tract, Sequence, Offertory, and Communion) are those used for Renaissance and Classical musical requiem settings, including the Dies Irae. This permits the performance of traditional requiem settings in the context of the Divine Worship Form of the Roman Rite on All Souls' Day as well as at funerals, votive celebrations of all faithful departed, and anniversaries of deaths.

In the ordinary form of the Roman Rite, as well as in the Personal Ordinariates established by Benedict XVI for former Anglicans, it remains on 2 November if this date falls on a Sunday; in the 1962–1969 form of the Roman Rite, use of which is still authorized, it is transferred to Monday, 3 November.

According to the sacred tradition of the Catholic Church, from 1 to 8 November it is possible to gain a plenary indulgence for the benefit of the souls of the departed who are in Purgatory. According to the Enchiridion of Indulgences, a plenary indulgence applicable only to the souls in purgatory (commonly called "the poor souls") is granted to the faithful who devoutly visit a cemetery (graveyard) and pray for the dead. The plenary indulgence can be gained between the second and ninth days of Allhallowtide (November 1–8); a partial indulgence is granted on other days of the year. In order to gain the plenary indulgence, the Christian must have received confession and absolution and the eucharist twenty days before or after visiting the graveyard, in addition to praying for the intentions of the Pope.

A plenary indulgence, applicable only to the poor souls, can be obtained by visiting a church, chapel or oratory on All Souls' Day and praying the Lord's Prayer there, along with the Apostle's Creed, Athanasian Creed or Nicene Creed. Alternatively, Christians can pray the Lauds or Vespers of the Office of the Dead and the Eternal Rest prayer for the dead.

==== Evangelical-Lutheran Churches ====
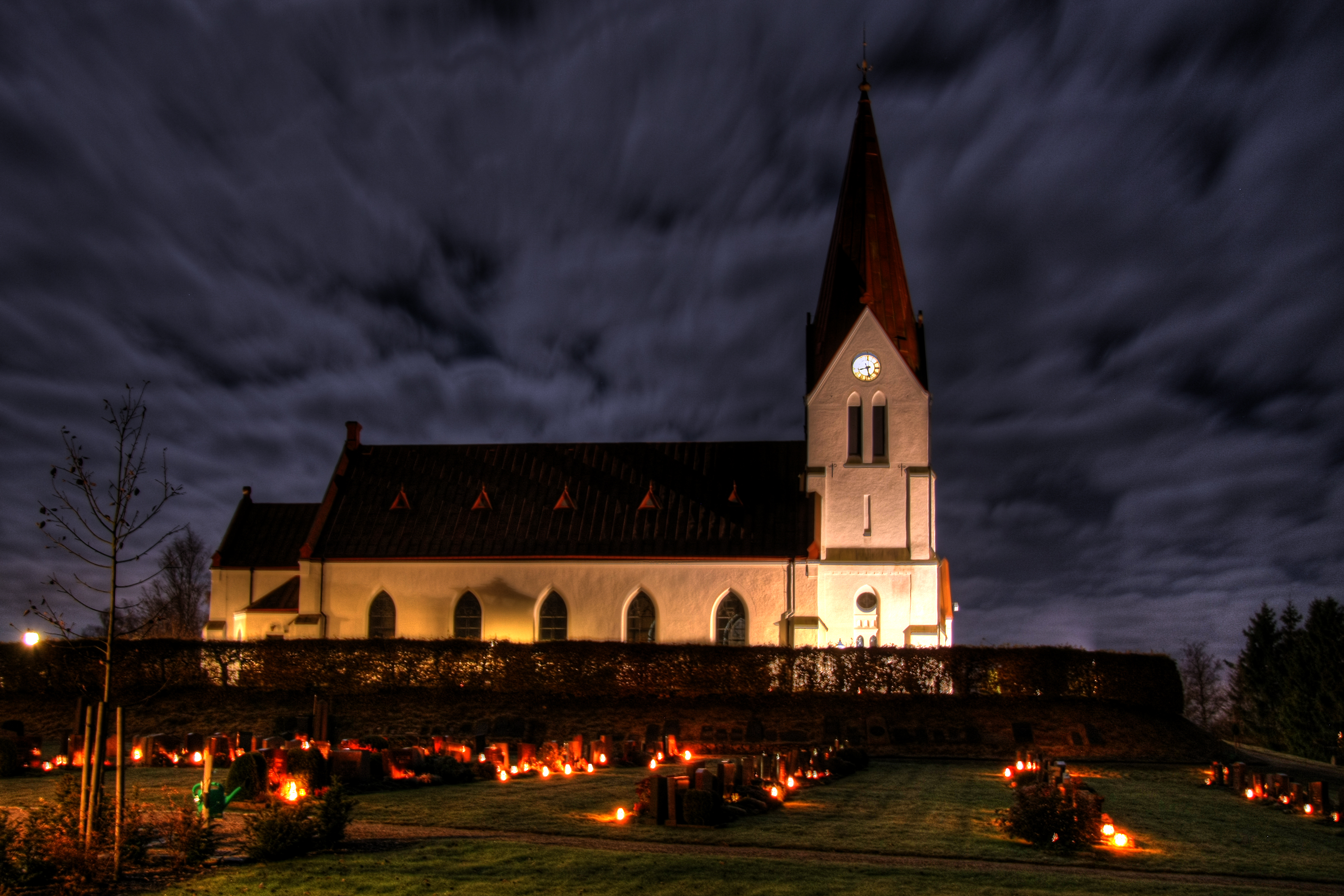
A graveyard outside a Lutheran church in the Swedish city of Röke during Allhallowtide

All Souls Day is observed in the Evangelical-Lutheran Churches. During Luther's lifetime, All Souls' Day was widely observed in Saxony; ecclesiastically in the Lutheran Church, the day was merged with and is often seen as an extension of All Saints' Day, with many Lutherans still visiting and decorating graves on all the days of Allhallowtide, including All Souls' Day. In the Lutheran Churches, "the whole people of God in Christ Jesus" are seen as saints and All Souls' Day commemorates those believers who have died as the 'faithful departed'. Just as it is the custom of French people, of all ranks and creeds, to decorate the graves of their dead on the jour des morts, Germans come to the graveyards on All Souls' Day with offerings of flowers and special grave lights. In Sweden, an Evangelical-Lutheran country, "people gather in churches lit with candles and decorated with wreaths to remember their loved ones" and "also visit cemeteries and leave special lanterns on people's graves that burn well into the night." An Evangelical Lutheran prayer said on All Souls' Day is as follows:

I would remember before Thee also my parents, pastors, teachers, children, kindred and benefactors, who have gone before me in the blessed faith and are now at home with Thee. If, through Jesus Christ, my prayer finds favor in Thy sight, do Thou, in my stead, repay unto them my thanks and love, in whatever manner it be possible. Unto all whom I have ever pained, deceived, or caused to sin, or whom I have robbed of honor, health, or possessions, whom I can no longer ask for pardon, nor restore unto them, because they already are gone into joy and pardon of every sin—gone home to Thee—to all these, O Lord, grant good for all my evil, both now and in the day of the resurrection of the just; even as Thou knowest how, and in how far all this which I ask can be granted. As for myself, let me spend my remaining days in prayer, in adoration of the most holy name of Jesus, and in praise and thanksgiving for the hearing of my prayers and those of all Christian people which have ever been offered up unto Thee through Jesus Christ. Amen.

The faithful light votive candles after attending High Mass on All Souls' Day at Engelbrekt Church (Evangelical-Lutheran) in Stockholm

A number of votive candles lit by Evangelical-Lutherans after the offering of the Mass on All Souls' Day at Engelbrekt Church (Evangelical-Lutheran) in Stockholm

Two young Evangelical-Lutheran ladies pray after lighting candles at a votive candle rack after the offering of the Mass on All Souls' Day at Engelbrekt Church (Evangelical-Lutheran) in Stockholm

==== Anglican Communion ====
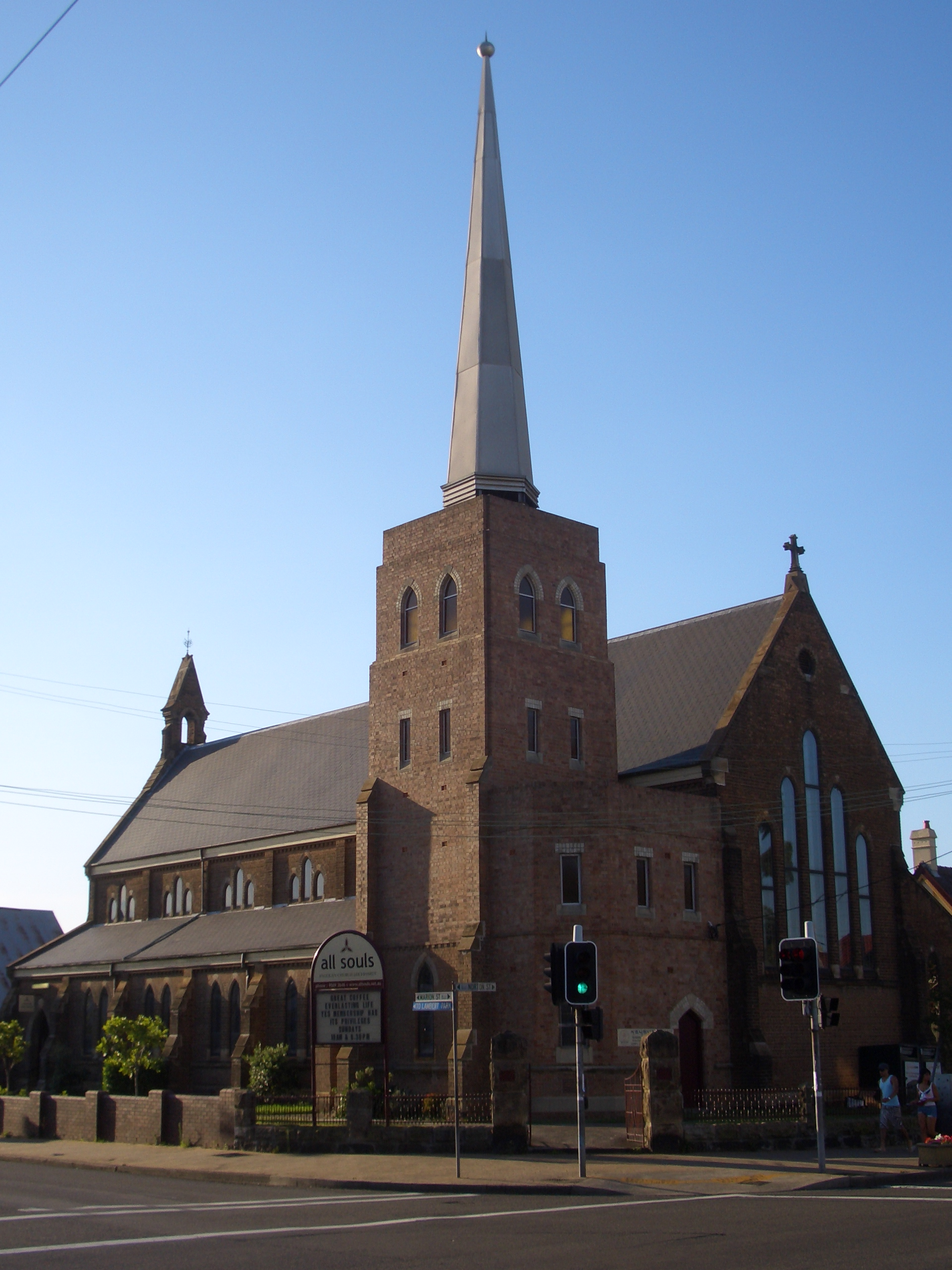
All Souls Anglican Church in the Diocese of Sydney, a parish dedicated to All Souls

In the Church of England it is called The Commemoration of the Faithful Departed and is an optional celebration; Anglicans view All Souls' Day as an extension of the observance of All Saints' Day and it serves to "remember those who have died", in connection with the theological doctrines of the resurrection of the body and the Communion of Saints.

In the Anglican Communion, All Souls' Day is known liturgically as the Commemoration of All Faithful Departed, and is an optional observance seen as "an extension of All Saints' Day", the latter of which marks the second day of Allhallowtide. Historically and at present, several Anglican churches are dedicated to All Souls. During the English Reformation, the observance of All Souls' Day lapsed, although a new Anglican theological understanding of the day has "led to a widespread acceptance of this commemoration among Anglicans". Patricia Bays, with regard to the Anglican view of All Souls' Day, wrote that:

All Souls Day … is a time when we particularly remember those who have died. The prayers appointed for that day remind us that we are joined with the Communion of Saints, that great group of Christians who have finished their earthly life and with who we share the hope of resurrection from the dead.

— Bays & Hancock 2012, p. 128

As such, Anglican parishes "now commemorate all the faithful departed in the context of the All Saints' Day celebration", in keeping with this fresh perspective. Contributing to the revival was the need "to help Anglicans mourn the deaths of millions of soldiers in World War I". Members of the Guild of All Souls, an Anglican devotional society founded in 1873, "are encouraged to pray for the dying and the dead, to participate in a requiem of All Souls' Day and say a Litany of the Faithful Departed at least once a month".

At the Reformation the celebration of All Souls' Day was fused with All Saints' Day in the Church of England or, in the judgement of some, it was "deservedly abrogated". It was reinstated in certain parishes in adherence to the Oxford Movement of the 19th century, known today as Anglo-Catholicism and is acknowledged in United States Anglicanism in the Holy Women, Holy Men calendar and in the Church of England with the 1980 Alternative Service Book. It features in Common Worship as a Lesser Festival called "Commemoration of the Faithful Departed (All Souls' Day)".

==== Reformed churches ====
Certain Reformed (Continental Reformed, Presbyterian, and Congregationalist) churches observe All Souls' Day. In All Souls' Day observances by the Reformed Churches, the theological doctrine of "the Christian belief in bodily resurrection and eternal life" is emphasized, along with a remembrance of the faithful departed. Additionally, dead are remembered on the feast of Totensonntag (Totenfest), the last Sunday before Advent. It was introduced in 1816, in Prussia, and in addition to the Reformed, it is observed by Lutherans in addition to Allhallowtide, particularly in areas with a large Germanic presence.

==== Methodist churches ====
In the Methodist Church, saints refer to all Christians and therefore, on All Saints' Day, the Church Universal, as well as the deceased members of a local congregation are honoured and remembered. In Methodist congregations that celebrate the liturgy on All Souls' Day, the observance, as with Anglicanism and Lutheranism, is viewed as an extension of All Saints' Day and as such, Methodists "remember our loved ones who had died" in their observance of this feast.

=== Eastern Catholic, Eastern Lutheran and Eastern Orthodox ===
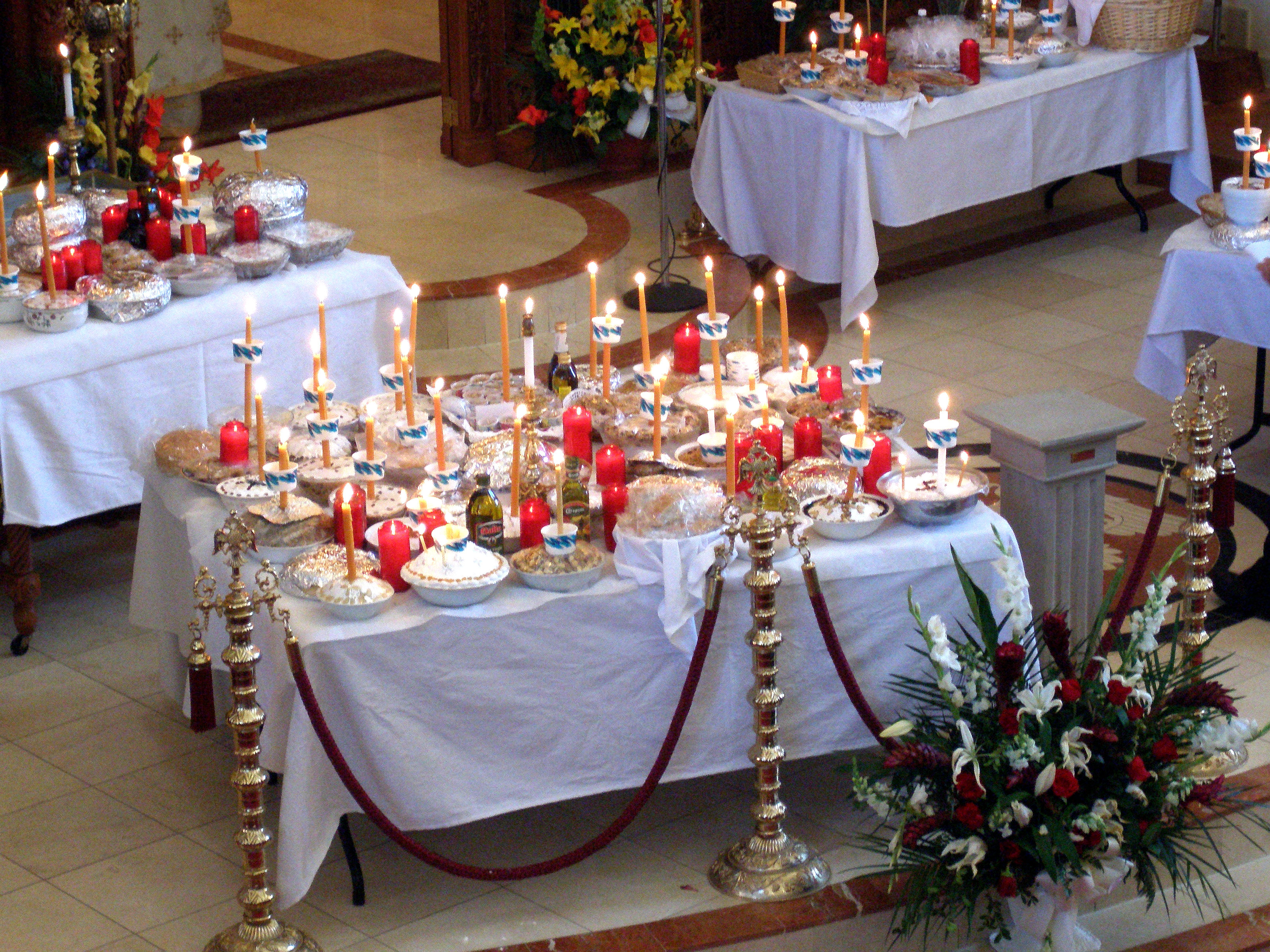
Kollyva offerings of boiled wheat blessed liturgically on Soul Saturday (Psychosabbaton)

Saturday of Souls (or Soul Saturday) is a day set aside for the commemoration of the dead within the liturgical year of the Eastern Orthodox, Eastern Lutheran and Byzantine Catholic Churches. Saturday is a traditional day of prayer for the dead, because Christ lay dead in the Tomb on Saturday.

These days are devoted to prayer for departed relatives and others among the faithful who would not be commemorated specifically as saints. The Divine Services on these days have special hymns added to them to commemorate the departed. There is often a Panikhida (Memorial Service) either after the Divine Liturgy on Saturday morning or after Vespers on Friday evening, for which Koliva (a dish made of boiled wheatberries or rice and honey) is prepared and placed on the Panikhida table. After the Service, the priest blesses the Koliva. It is then eaten as a memorial by all present.

==== Radonitsa ====
Another Memorial Day in the East, Radonitsa, does not fall on a Saturday, but on either Monday or Tuesday of the second week after Pascha (Easter). Radonitsa does not have special hymns for the dead at the Divine Services. Instead a Panikhida will follow the Divine Liturgy, and then all will bring paschal foods to the cemeteries to greet the departed with the joy of the Resurrection.

=== East Syriac tradition ===
East Syriac churches including the Syro Malabar Church and Chaldean Catholic Church commemorates the feast of departed faithful on the last Friday of Epiphany season (which means Friday just before start of Great Lent). The season of Epiphanytide remembers the revelation of Christ to the world. Each Friday of Epiphany season, the church remembers important evangelistic figures.

In the Syro Malabar Church, the Friday before the parish festival is also celebrated as feast of departed faithful when the parish remembers the activities of forebears who worked for the parish and faithful. They also request the intercession of all departed souls for the faithful celebration of parish festival. In East Syriac liturgy, the church remembers departed souls including saints on every Friday throughout the year since the Christ was crucified and died on Friday.

== Popular customs ==
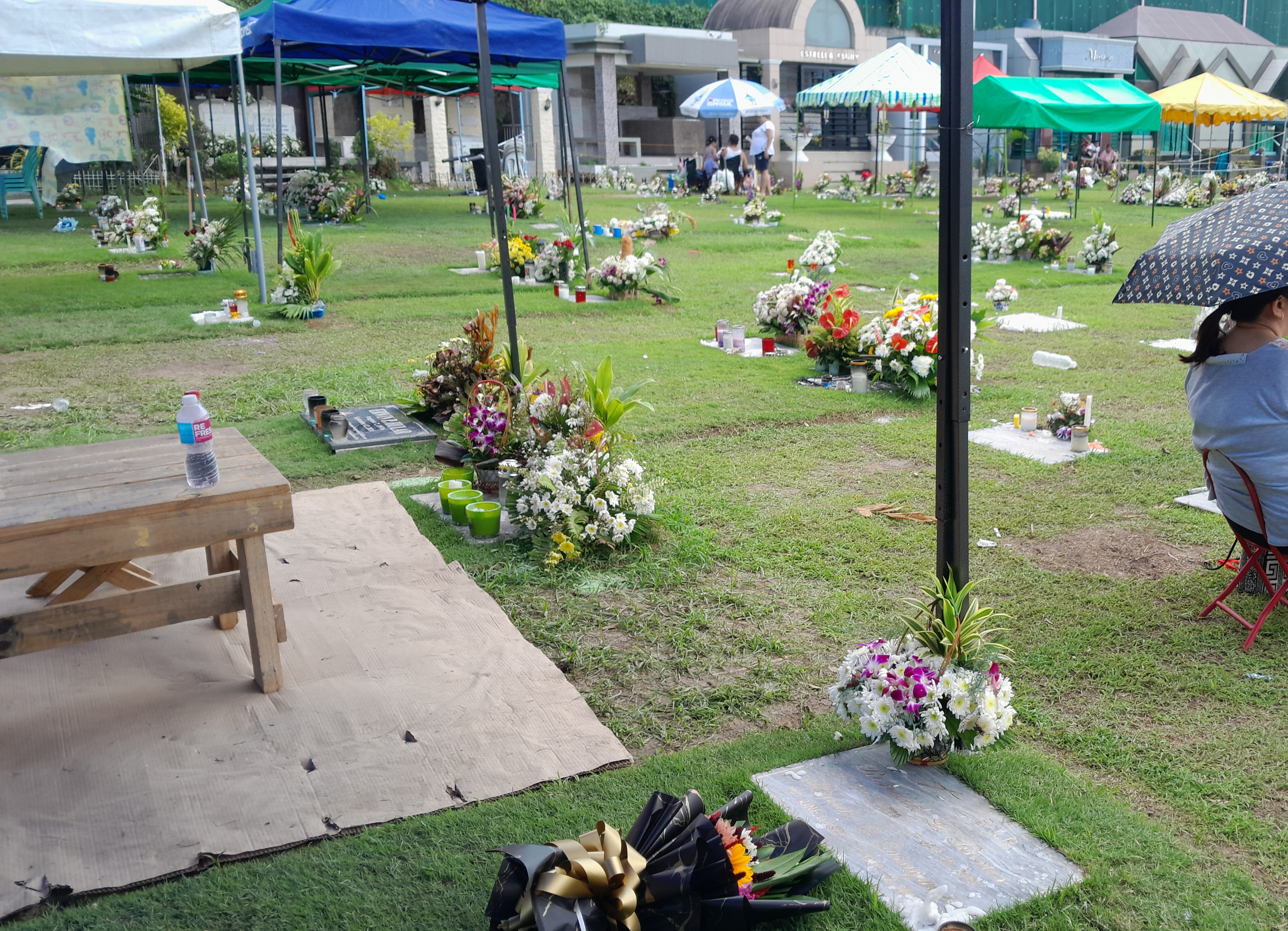
A cemetery on All Souls' Day in the Philippines, with flowers left after the festivities of the previous night (All Souls' Day eve on All Saints' Day).

On All Souls' Day, Christians of various denominational backgrounds, including Catholics, Lutherans, Anglicans and Methodists, among others, often help one another clean the graves of cemeteries, along with adorning them with flowers. The General Secretary of the Church of North India described the ecumenism present in All Souls' Day, stating that "This coming together shows Christian unity". With respect to the economy, vendors "sell flowers, candles and incense sticks" to those visiting the graveyards, who are Christians of the Catholic and Protestant traditions. Prayer services with representatives from different Christian denomination for All Souls' Day are held at graveyards for those visiting them.

All Souls' Day emphasizes "the Christian belief in bodily resurrection and eternal life". Some All Souls' Day traditions are associated with the doctrine of the poor souls of purgatory (in Roman Catholicism) or the intermediate state (in Protestantism and Orthodoxy). Church bell tolling is done in honour of the dead. Lighting candles serves variously to kindle a light for the poor souls, honour the dead, as well as to ward off demons. Soul cakes are given to children going souling—going from door to door to pray for the dead (cf. trick-or-treating, Pão-por-Deus).

=== Europe ===
All Souls' Day is celebrated in many European countries with vigils, candles, the decoration of graves, and special prayers as well as many regional customs. Examples of regional customs include leaving cakes for departed loved ones on the table and keeping the room warm for their comfort in Tirol and the custom in Brittany, where people flock to the cemeteries at nightfall to kneel, bareheaded, at the graves of their loved ones and anoint the hollow of the tombstone with holy water or to pour libations of milk on it. At bedtime, supper is left on the table for the souls. All Souls' Day is known in Maltese as Jum il-Mejtin, and is accompanied by a traditional supper including roasted pig, based on a custom of letting a pig loose on the streets with a bell around its neck, to be fed by the entire neighborhood and cooked on that day to feed the poor. In Linz, funereal musical pieces known as aequales were played from tower tops on All Souls' Day and the evening before. In the Czech Republic and Slovakia All Souls' Day is called Dušičky, or "little souls". Traditionally, candles are left on graves on Dušičky.

In Sicily and other regions of southern Italy, All Souls' Day is celebrated as the Festa dei Morti or U juornu rii morti, the "Commemoration of the Dead" or the "Day of the Dead", which according to Joshua Nicolosi of the Sicilian Post could be seen "halfway between Christian and pagan traditions". Families visit and clean grave sites, home altars are decorated with family photos and votive candles, and children are gifted a special basket or cannistru of chocolates, pomegranate, and other gifts from their ancestors. Because of the gifting of sugary sweets and the emphasis on sugar puppet decorations, the Commemoration Day has spurred local Sicilian events such as the Notte di Zucchero ("Night of Sugar") in which communities celebrate the dead. Piada dei morti (lit. 'piada of the dead'), a sweet focaccia topped with raisins, almonds, walnuts, and pine nuts, is traditionally eaten in November for All Souls' Day in the environs of Rimini, in Emilia-Romagna.

=== Indian subcontinent ===
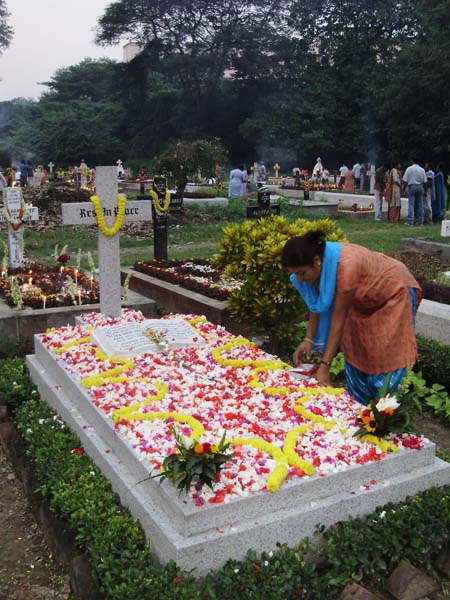
A Christian woman in India decorates a grave with flower petals.

In the Indian subcontinent (India, Pakistan and Bangladesh), Christians hold prayer services in which they pray for the faithful departed, especially remembering their loved ones. Christians of various denominations visit cemeteries and adorn graves with flower petals, garlands, candles and incense sticks.

=== Philippines ===
In the Philippines, Hallowmas is variously called Undás, Todos los Santos ("All Saints"), and sometimes Araw ng mga Patáy/Yumao (Tagalog, "Day of the dead/those who have passed away"), which incorporates All Saints' Day and All Souls' Day. Filipinos traditionally observe this day by visiting the family dead to clean and repair their tombs. Offerings of prayers, flowers, candles, and food. Chinese Filipinos additionally burn incense and kim. Many also spend the day and ensuing night holding reunions at the cemetery with feasts and merriment.

== See also ==
- Zaduszki
- Totensonntag
- Purgatorial society
- Guild of All Souls
- Flowering Sunday
- Cemetery Sunday
