= Cemetery Sunday =

Cemetery Sunday (also referred to as Blessing of the Graves) is an annual ancestor veneration observance held in Roman Catholic cemeteries in Ireland and along routes of Irish migration. Parishioners prepare by cleaning family graves and, in some cemeteries, decorating the graves. Grave decorations incorporate flowers as well as crafts and mementos. In cemeteries where a priest is not available, Cemetery Sunday may still be held absent the formal service and blessing.

== Dates observed ==
In Ireland, the date varies by parish, and is typically in summer. Parishes coordinate to avoid scheduling Cemetery Sunday on the same week so that families can attend services at all cemeteries where their relatives are buried. For churches which are no longer used, Cemetery Sunday can be the only regularly held service on the grounds.

In the United States, Cemetery Sunday is the first Sunday in November, around the time of All Souls' Day.

== Observance in Ireland ==
=== Earliest Irish observances ===
St. James Church (Church of Ireland) in Dublin, had a long-established tradition of cemetery cleaning and decoration in conjunction with the Fair of St. James, historically held on July 25, the Pattern Sunday for St. James. There are records of burials at St. James as early as 1495 and it is believed that the cemetery may have been in use as early as the 13th century. There is no known documentation of when cemetery decoration began at the St. James Cemetery, but it was well established by the early 19th century.

The fair itself was banned from the public streets by the 1730s but continued in a smaller way next to the cemetery through the 1820s. In 1821, G. N. Wright wrote of a custom to "deck the graves with garlands and ornaments, made of white paper, disposed into very extraordinary forms". By 1828, Nicholas Carlisle characterized St. James cemetery decoration as a custom that was already old:

It was, and perhaps is still, the custom in Dublin on St. James’s day, for the relatives and friends of those who are buried in St. James’s church-yard, to dress up the Graves with flowers, cut paper, Scripture phrases, garlands, chaplets, and a number of other pretty and pious devices, where those affectionate mementos remained, until they were displaced by fresh ones the next year.

Burials continued in the St. James Cemetery through the 19th and 20th century before ceasing completely due to the closure of the cemetery.

== Ritual elements ==
=== Cemetery maintenance and decoration ===
==== Cleaning ====
For days or weeks before the designated Cemetery Sunday at a particular cemetery, family members of those buried there work to clean and tidy the graves. This may also include removing overgrown plants and debris from the cemetery and other general maintenance to the grounds.

==== Flowers ====
Cemetery decoration often features cut flowers. Homemade crepe paper flowers were also common in early St. James cemetery decoration. Today, artificial flowers are often used. Flowers can be placed on graves in any number of ways, including in patterns.

==== Grave tokens ====
Decoration can include the placing of tokens at individual graves. Tokens are often personal or household items significant to the relationship between the person who places the token and the deceased.

=== Festivities ===
==== Homecomings and family reunions ====
Relatives of the deceased often choose Cemetery Sundays to return home for visits and reunions after moving away.

==== Food and drink ====
Food is a common element in many Cemetery Sunday traditions. Many families go for a celebratory meal after the service.

==== Music and singing ====
Singing is also common but not universal. Music is often played from the altar on which the priest leads the sermon.

==== Prayer Service ====
Prayer services are led by local parish priests and sometimes nuns. The Rosary is almost universally said as part of the prayer service. The priest will either bless the graves individually, or in larger cemeteries will leave bottles of Holy Water for the family to bless the grave with themselves.

== Connection to Decoration Day in Appalachia and Liberia ==
Scholar Barbara Graham connects Cemetery Sunday traditions to the Decoration Day traditions of Appalachia and Liberia as many Irish and Scotch-Irish refugees and other immigrants from Ireland settled in Central and Southern Appalachia.

== See also ==
- Decoration Day (Appalachia and Liberia)
- Flowering Sunday
- Pattern (devotional)
