= Pattern (devotional) =

Devotions on patronal days in Irish Catholicism

A pattern (Irish: pátrún) in Irish Roman Catholicism refers to the devotions that take place within a parish on the feast day of the patron saint of the parish, on that date, called a Pattern day, or the nearest Sunday, called Pattern Sunday. In the case of a local folk saint from Celtic Christianity, there may be archaeological remains traditionally associated with the saint, such as holy wells reputed to have healing powers. Often the parish priest will say Mass or lead prayers at such a site, sometimes processing between several locations. In some parishes, Pattern Sunday coincides with Cemetery Sunday, an annual ancestor veneration observance held in cemeteries which typically includes the cleaning and decoration of family graves as well as religious rituals.

== Tradition ==
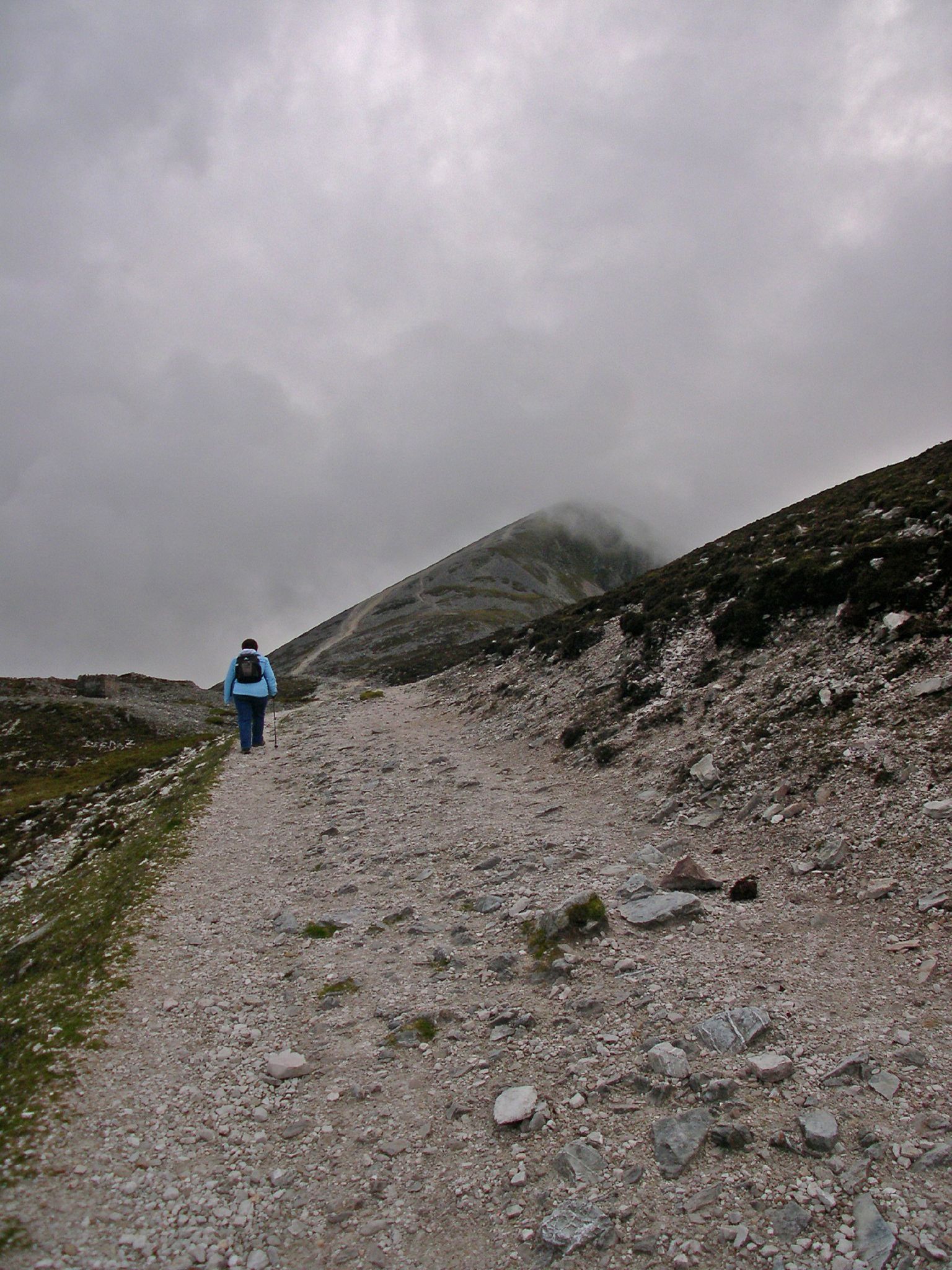
Pilgrimage path at Croagh Patrick

The name pattern is a corruption of patron, as in "patron saint".

In the earlier days of the Church, festivities began with religious devotions at the church, but this came to an end with the confiscation and/or destruction of Roman Catholic churches between the 1540s and the 1690s, during the Reformation. By 1700, the devastation was such that very few, if any, churches in Ireland remained under Catholic control and public religious ceremonies almost disappeared. With the passage of the Penal Laws, the institutional church was an outlawed religious society; its churches few, its clergy scarce. With the central location of their devotions gone, people found alternative ways to honour their saint's feast day. While many of the faithful paid homage at the saint's shrine or in the ruins of their local church, most devotions took place at a nearby holy well, celebrated for its curative power. The earliest reference to the Pattern in Ardmore can be found in the calendar of State Papers of June 12, 1611, which mention "a grant of a fair to be held at Ardmore Co. Waterford, on St. Declan's Eve or Day. Before 1800 St. Declan's Stone and the Oratory containing his skull formed the centre of the festivities on St. Declan's Day. Other places noted for large attendance include St. Patrick's Purgatory and Croagh Patrick.

Priests would often assign making a pattern at a local well as a penance for sins; pilgrimages to such sites as Croagh Patrick also had a penitential purpose. The largest patterns would attract thousands of people. Although held in rural areas, the patterns attracted crowds from nearby towns. People would “pay rounds” by circumambulating a Holy Well a prescribed number of times in a clockwise or sunwise direction, reciting a rosary during each round, replicating an ancient Celtic rite known as the deiseal. At some sites participants would proceed to various "stations", such as a small oratory, the saint's grave, or a Celtic cross in a predetermined and customary order. Having completed the religious devotion participants would also engage in activities such as gaming, singing, dancing, and horse racing. Some patterns lasted for several days.

== Decline ==
Patterns were a common part of Irish rural tradition until the reforms of Cardinal Paul Cullen in the 1850s. Eventually, the clergy began to oppose the excesses of these popular festivals—the fighting, the drunkenness, and immorality. They also criticized the popular pious belief in the magical powers of the wells and other holy sites. This opposition gained momentum in the late eighteenth century as bishops began to issue edicts forbidding the people to participate in such wild festivals. Pilgrimages did in fact decline but this was due to the Famine and social change. This coincided with a decline in the Irish language and the expansion of popular education. As the Gaelic language and culture waned, the traditional lore and rituals faded as well.

== Modern patterns ==
At one time almost every parish in the country celebrated a patron day, but only a small number still survive. The early 1900s saw a revival in the practice of patterns. Pattern Sunday is often a local summer festival with secular activities such as music and dance. Examples include:

- Ardmore, County Waterford — on the eve and feast of Declán of Ardmore (July 24)
- Ballyheigue, County Kerry - on the feast of the Nativity of Mary (September 8)
- Brideswell Pattern Festival in County Roscommon is on Garland Sunday, the Sunday before Lughnasadh.
- Clonmacnoise, on St. Ciaran's Day (September 9)
- Tuosist, County Kerry — on the feast of Saint Killian (July 8)
- Kilmovee, County Mayo — the Pattern of Urlaur on the feast of Saint Dominic (August 4)
- Ballylanders, County Limerick - on the feast of the Assumption of Mary (August 15)
- Inishmore, Aran Islands. - Patrún Naomh Éanna. Last weekend of June

== See also ==
- Cemetery Sunday
- Clootie well, holy wells in Scotland and Ireland.
- pardon (ceremony) in Brittany

== Sources ==
- Ó Cadhla, Stiófan (2002). The Holy Well Tradition: The Pattern of St. Declan, Ardmore, County Waterford 1800-2000. Maynooth Studies in Local History. Dublin: Four Courts Press. ISBN 1-85182-706-4.
