= Clay Dyer =

American fisherman

Clay Dyer (born May 23, 1978, in Hamilton, Alabama) is a professional sport bass fisherman. Dyer was born without any lower limbs, no arm on the left side and a partial arm on the right. His motto for life is "If I can, you can."

== Professional career ==
Dyer's physical limitations have not dampened his determination and positive spirit. He started fishing at age 5 and began tournament fishing at age 13. He refuses to use special equipment, wanting to cast with one hand as others do with two. He casts by tucking the rod under his jaw and whipping it around with a quick left-to-right twist. He reels fish in while holding the end of the rod under his chin. He ties knots with his tongue and unhooks fish with his teeth.

Dyer fishes on the Bassmaster Open Series. He has fished in more than 200 bass tournaments and placed first in approximately 20 state bass tournaments. He is sponsored by O.R.C.A. coolers, Strike King Lure Co., Ranger Boats and Mercury Marine.

== Other activities ==
In addition to his competitive fishing, Dyer is also a motivational speaker for corporations, churches, and charitable organizations.

== Biography ==
Dyer's biography, The View From Down Here is Just Fine, was written by Scot Laney. Dyer is also the subject of chapters in three other books: Living Life in the Zone, Performance Intelligence at Work, and Dance Until it Rains. Clay currently fishing the Bassmaster Southern Open series. He makes 60+ speaking appearances each year. Clay is married to the love of his life, Kim, who ironically had the same love for Bass fishing as Clay. The two married on November 9, 2013.

== See also ==
- Bob Wieland
