= Hamilton, Alabama =

City in Alabama, United States

- City
- Flag Seal

- Location in Marion County, Alabama
- Coordinates: 34°08′05″N 87°59′20″W
- Country: United States
- State: Alabama
- County: Marion

Area
  - Total: 38.08 sq mi (98.6 km^{2})
  - Land: 38.06 sq mi (98.6 km^{2})
  - Water: 0.01 sq mi (0.026 km^{2})
- Elevation: 443 ft (135 m)

Population (2020)
  - Total: 7,042
  - Density: 185.01/sq mi (71.43/km^{2})
- Time zone: UTC-6 (Central (CST))
  - Summer (DST): UTC-5 (CDT)
- ZIP code: 35570
- Area codes: 205, 659
- FIPS code: 01-32848
- GNIS feature ID: 2403785
- Website: hamiltoncityal.org

Hamilton is a city in and the county seat of Marion County, Alabama, United States. It incorporated in 1896 and since 1980 has been the county's largest city, surpassing Winfield. It was previously the largest town in 1910. At the 2020 census, the population was 7,042.

== History ==
Hamilton was founded in the early 19th century by settlers who moved to the Alabama Territory from Tennessee, Kentucky, Virginia, Georgia and the Carolinas. It is built upon lands that once served as "hunting grounds" for the Chickasaw people. The city was first called "Toll Gate", but its name later changed in honor of one of its distinguished citizens, Captain Albert James Hamilton (known as A.J. Hamilton), who had represented Marion County in the state legislature in the sessions of 1869, 1874 and 1875. Captain Hamilton donated forty acres of his land to the town. The same forty acres were then divided into lots and sold to help defray the cost of building the courthouse. The Toll Gate community was elected in 1881 to be the next county seat, and by 1883 the Marion County courthouse in Pikeville had ceased to be functional. When the courthouse was moved from Pikeville to Toll Gate, the town's name was then changed from Toll Gate to Hamilton. On March 30, 1887, the newly built county courthouse was destroyed by fire. It was again rebuilt with wood, but replaced in 1901 with native sandstone.

During the Civil War, Union forces passed through the town in search of goods and horses. A detachment of Wilson's Cavalry destroyed by fire the plantation belonging to the Helvingstons on the Military Ford, south of Toll Gate (Hamilton).

== Geography ==
Hamilton is located west of the center of Marion County, in the valley of the Buttahatchee River. Interstate 22 passes around the southern and western sides of the city, with access from Exits 7, 11, 14, and 16. I-22 leads west 45 miles (72 km) to Tupelo, Mississippi, and southeast 89 miles (143 km) to Birmingham. U.S. Routes 43 and 278 pass through Hamilton. US 43 leads north 53 miles (85 km) to Florence, while US 278 leads east 74 miles (119 km) to Cullman. The two highways join at the center of Hamilton and lead south together 13 miles (21 km) to Guin.

According to the United States Census Bureau, Hamilton has a total area of 38.1 square miles (99 km^{2}), of which 0.01 square miles (0.03 km^{2}), 0.04%, are water. The Buttahatchee River, a tributary of the Tombigbee River, flows northeast to southwest through the city, east of downtown.

=== Climate ===
According to the Köppen Climate Classification system, Hamilton has a humid subtropical climate, abbreviated "Cfa" on climate maps. The hottest temperature recorded in Hamilton was 109 °F (42.8 °C) on August 16, 2007, while the coldest temperature recorded was −19 °F (−28.3 °C) on January 30, 1966.

Climate data for Hamilton, Alabama, 1991–2020 normals, extremes 1962–present
Month	Jan	Feb	Mar	Apr	May	Jun	Jul	Aug	Sep	Oct	Nov	Dec	Year
Record high °F (°C)	79 (26)	87 (31)	90 (32)	95 (35)	98 (37)	103 (39)	107 (42)	109 (43)	104 (40)	102 (39)	91 (33)	81 (27)	109 (43)
Mean maximum °F (°C)	72.3 (22.4)	76.8 (24.9)	84.0 (28.9)	88.1 (31.2)	91.5 (33.1)	95.9 (35.5)	98.3 (36.8)	98.7 (37.1)	95.8 (35.4)	88.8 (31.6)	80.4 (26.9)	72.8 (22.7)	100.2 (37.9)
Mean daily maximum °F (°C)	52.5 (11.4)	57.6 (14.2)	66.7 (19.3)	75.1 (23.9)	81.9 (27.7)	88.5 (31.4)	91.5 (33.1)	91.3 (32.9)	86.5 (30.3)	76.1 (24.5)	64.1 (17.8)	55.1 (12.8)	73.9 (23.3)
Daily mean °F (°C)	40.4 (4.7)	44.3 (6.8)	52.1 (11.2)	60.1 (15.6)	68.5 (20.3)	76.3 (24.6)	79.8 (26.6)	79.1 (26.2)	73.3 (22.9)	61.6 (16.4)	50.1 (10.1)	43.3 (6.3)	60.7 (16.0)
Mean daily minimum °F (°C)	28.3 (−2.1)	31.1 (−0.5)	37.5 (3.1)	45.1 (7.3)	55.1 (12.8)	64.1 (17.8)	68.1 (20.1)	66.9 (19.4)	60.1 (15.6)	47.1 (8.4)	36.1 (2.3)	31.4 (−0.3)	47.6 (8.7)
Mean minimum °F (°C)	9.5 (−12.5)	13.9 (−10.1)	19.3 (−7.1)	27.4 (−2.6)	38.5 (3.6)	52.3 (11.3)	59.1 (15.1)	57.3 (14.1)	43.9 (6.6)	29.1 (−1.6)	19.5 (−6.9)	15.2 (−9.3)	7.5 (−13.6)
Record low °F (°C)	−19 (−28)	−1 (−18)	5 (−15)	21 (−6)	30 (−1)	37 (3)	48 (9)	46 (8)	30 (−1)	21 (−6)	9 (−13)	−5 (−21)	−19 (−28)
Average precipitation inches (mm)	5.46 (139)	6.01 (153)	5.29 (134)	6.09 (155)	5.79 (147)	4.86 (123)	5.12 (130)	4.31 (109)	3.94 (100)	3.84 (98)	4.58 (116)	6.42 (163)	61.71 (1,567)
Average snowfall inches (cm)	0.4 (1.0)	0.4 (1.0)	0.3 (0.76)	0.0 (0.0)	0.0 (0.0)	0.0 (0.0)	0.0 (0.0)	0.0 (0.0)	0.0 (0.0)	0.0 (0.0)	0.0 (0.0)	0.2 (0.51)	1.3 (3.27)
Average precipitation days (≥ 0.01 in)	10.5	10.2	10.5	8.7	8.9	9.6	10.2	9.1	6.3	6.8	8.5	10.0	109.3
Average snowy days (≥ 0.1 in)	0.4	0.3	0.1	0.0	0.0	0.0	0.0	0.0	0.0	0.0	0.0	0.2	1.0
Source 1: NOAA
Source 2: National Weather Service

== Demographics ==
Historical population
Census	Pop.	Note	%±
1900	235		—
1910	422		79.6%
1920	487		15.4%
1930	695		42.7%
1940	1,002		44.2%
1950	1,623		62.0%
1960	1,934		19.2%
1970	3,088		59.7%
1980	5,093		64.9%
1990	5,787		13.6%
2000	6,786		17.3%
2010	6,885		1.5%
2020	7,042		2.3%
U.S. Decennial Census

=== Racial and ethnic composition ===
Hamilton city, Alabama – Racial and ethnic composition Note: the US Census treats Hispanic/Latino as an ethnic category. This table excludes Latinos from the racial categories and assigns them to a separate category. Hispanics/Latinos may be of any race. Race and ethnicity were not reported in Alabama for populations under 2,500 in 1980 and under 1,000 in 1990.
Race / Ethnicity (NH = Non-Hispanic)	Pop 1980	Pop 1990	Pop 2000	Pop 2010	Pop 2020	% 1980	% 1990	% 2000	% 2010	% 2020
White alone (NH)	4,874	5,428	6,075	6,040	5,907	95.70%	93.80%	89.52%	87.73%	83.88%
Black or African American alone (NH)	151	315	513	531	491	2.96%	5.44%	7.56%	7.71%	6.97%
Native American or Alaska Native alone (NH)	0	14	21	20	30	0.00%	0.24%	0.31%	0.29%	0.43%
Asian alone (NH)	0	12	21	15	23	0.00%	0.21%	0.31%	0.22%	0.33%
Native Hawaiian or Pacific Islander alone (NH)	x	x	0	1	7	x	x	0.00%	0.01%	0.10%
Other race alone (NH)	0	0	3	7	11	0.00%	0.00%	0.04%	0.10%	0.16%
Mixed race or Multiracial (NH)	x	x	37	60	281	x	x	0.55%	0.87%	3.99%
Hispanic or Latino (any race)	68	17	116	211	292	1.34%	0.29%	1.71%	3.06%	4.15%
Total	5,093	5,787	6,786	6,885	7,042	100.00%	100.00%	100.00%	100.00%	100.00%

=== 2020 census ===
As of the 2020 census, Hamilton had a population of 7,042 and contained 2,795 households, of which 1,695 were families.

The median age was 40.4 years. 22.2% of residents were under the age of 18 and 18.9% of residents were 65 years of age or older. For every 100 females there were 104.4 males, and for every 100 females age 18 and over there were 101.9 males age 18 and over.

0.0% of residents lived in urban areas, while 100.0% lived in rural areas.

There were 2,795 households in Hamilton, of which 28.9% had children under the age of 18 living in them. Of all households, 44.0% were married-couple households, 17.7% were households with a male householder and no spouse or partner present, and 32.8% were households with a female householder and no spouse or partner present. About 33.3% of all households were made up of individuals and 14.9% had someone living alone who was 65 years of age or older.

There were 3,105 housing units, of which 10.0% were vacant. The homeowner vacancy rate was 1.8% and the rental vacancy rate was 6.9%.

=== 2010 census ===
At the 2010 census there were 6,885 people, 2,717 households, and 1,793 families living in the city. The population density was 190.7 inhabitants per square mile (73.6/km^{2}). There were 3,096 housing units at an average density of 85.8 per square mile (33.1/km^{2}). The racial makeup of the city was 89.3% White, 7.7% Black or African American, 0.4% Native American, 0.2% Asian, 0.0% Pacific Islander, 1.2% from other races, and 1.1% from two or more races. 3.1% of the population were Hispanic or Latino of any race. Of the 2,717 households 25.2% had children under the age of 18 living with them, 48.1% were married couples living together, 13.7% had a female householder with no husband present, and 34.0% were non-families. 30.9% of households were one person and 13.7% were one person aged 65 or older. The average household size was 2.30 and the average family size was 2.83.

The age distribution was 19.9% under the age of 18, 7.5% from 18 to 24, 25.1% from 25 to 44, 28.4% from 45 to 64, and 19.0% 65 or older. The median age was 43.2 years. For every 100 females, there were 106.8 males. For every 100 females age 18 and over, there were 111.2 males.

The median household income was $31,297 and the median family income was $42,361. Males had a median income of $31,112 versus $30,542 for females. The per capita income for the city was $17,442. About 12.1% of families and 19.2% of the population were below the poverty line, including 30.1% of those under age 18 and 15.5% of those age 65 or over.

=== 2000 census ===
At the 2000 census there were 6,786 people, 2,695 households, and 1,800 families living in the city. The population density was 188.0 inhabitants per square mile (72.6/km^{2}). There were 3,065 housing units at an average density of 84.9 per square mile (32.8/km^{2}). The racial makeup of the city was 90.41% White, 7.59% Black or African American, 0.32% Native American, 0.49% Asian, 0.03% Pacific Islander, 0.49% from other races, and 0.68% from two or more races. 1.71% of the population were Hispanic or Latino of any race. Of the 2,695 households 28.3% had children under the age of 18 living with them, 52.6% were married couples living together, 11.3% had a female householder with no husband present, and 33.2% were non-families. 30.6% of households were one person and 14.4% were one person aged 65 or older. The average household size was 2.26 and the average family size was 2.81.

The age distribution was 19.8% under the age of 18, 8.9% from 18 to 24, 29.0% from 25 to 44, 25.9% from 45 to 64, and 16.5% 65 or older. The median age was 40 years. For every 100 females, there were 106.9 males. For every 100 females age 18 and over, there were 106.6 males.

The median household income was $27,489 and the median family income was $34,485. Males had a median income of $26,362 versus $18,681 for females. The per capita income for the city was $17,505. About 12.0% of families and 17.8% of the population were below the poverty line, including 23.7% of those under age 18 and 19.6% of those age 65 or over.

== Arts and culture ==
Several cemeteries in Hamilton still celebrate annual Decoration Days in the spring and summer.

=== Artifacts ===
- Indian Mounds site

=== Festivals ===
- Jerry Brown Arts Festival (held annually the first weekend in March)
- Buttahatchee River Fall Fest (held annually in October)
- Hamilton's Hometown Christmas (held annually in December)

=== Parades ===
- Homecoming parade (sponsored by Hamilton High School each fall)
- Hamilton Christmas parade (held annually in December)

== Parks and recreation ==
- E.T. Sims Jr. Recreation Center, park, and playground
- Key Branch Nature Trail and Aggieland Disc Golf course
- Splash Pad playground

== Education ==
Hamilton is a part of the Marion County Schools. Hamilton Elementary School, Hamilton Middle School, and Hamilton High School serve the Hamilton area.

Hamilton has a branch campus of Bevill State Community College.

== Media ==
Hamilton's local newspaper, The Journal Record, has a second office in Winfield, Alabama.

Hamilton is home to two local television stations: WMTY TV 46 (cable channel 5 ), and TV8-WATVC.

== Infrastructure ==
Marion County – Rankin Fite Airport is located in Hamilton.

There is no fixed-route transit service in Hamilton. However, the Northwest Alabama Council of Local Governments operates a dial-a-ride transit service known as NACOLG Transit.

== Notable people ==
- Bookie Bolin, former NFL player
- Jerry Brown, folk artist and traditional potter
- Roger Brown, artist
- Clay Dyer, professional bass fisherman
- Rankin Fite, Alabama State Legislature (Senate & House of Representatives)
- Rex Frederick, first head coach of the University of South Alabama men's basketball team
- John Dabney Terrell Sr., planter and legislator
- Karen Wheaton, Christian music artist, minister, founder of The Ramp
