= Karen Wheaton =

American Pentecostal preacher and musician

- Also known as: Karen Harris Wheaton; Karen Harris Wheaton Towe
- Born: Karen A. Harris; September 30, 1960 (age 65)
- Genres: Gospel

Karen Harris Wheaton Towe is an American Pentecostal preacher, gospel singer, and recording artist based in Hamilton, Alabama, whose career has spanned the late 1970s until the present. Wheaton has been identified among notable "internationally known praise and worship artists". She has toured throughout the US, performing at events that also featured preachers and Christian artists such as Jim Bakker, Jimmy Swaggart, Benny Hinn, and the Gaither Homecoming. Her singing voice is classified in the Mississippi Delta style, which is fused with blues, urban contemporary gospel, and bluegrass gospel influences.

She is the founder and director of The Ramp, a youth ministry located in the city of Hamilton, Alabama. The Ramp operates with the goal of "awaken[ing] a generation", holding Christian rallies, concerts, and conferences for different groups of worshipers.

== Discography ==
- Live in the Spirit (1989)
- Promise (1991)
- Remembering (1992)
- Pentecostal Fire (1994)
- There Is a God (1995)
- Gentle Breezes (1996)
- I'm Still Here (1997)
- Miracle in Motion (1997)
- My Alabaster Box (1998)
- Church (2000)
- Nothin But Good - 20 years - (2000)
- Freedom (2003)
- Believe (2006)

== Bibliography ==
- Watching the Road: Praying Your Prodigal Home (2018)
