= Hamilton High School (Hamilton, Alabama) =

Coordinates: 34.13901°N 87.99116°W

Location
- 211 Aggie Avenue; Hamilton, Alabama 35570; United States

Information
- School type: Public
- Established: 1895 (131 years ago)
- School district: Marion County Schools
- CEEB code: 011365
- Principal: David Cantrell
- Grades: 9-12
- Enrollment: 456 (2023-2024)
- Colors: Maroon and white
- Mascot: Aggies
- Yearbook: Agi-H-Eco
- Website: www.mcbe.net/o/hamiltonhigh

Hamilton High School is a high school located in Hamilton, Alabama, United States. The school is a part of the Marion County Schools. Hamilton was started in 1895 as West Alabama Agricultural School. Hamilton is currently a class 4A school.

== Athletics ==
Hamilton High School fields athletic teams in several different sports, including football, men's and women's basketball, baseball, softball, volleyball, cross country and track, men's and women's golf, cheerleading and soccer. The Aggies have won six AHSAA state championships, including women's basketball in 1990 and men's cross country in 1987, 1988, 1989, 1990, and 1991. The 1991 women's basketball team finished as the state runner up to Pell City. In football, the Aggies reached the AHSAA Super Six State Championship Game in 2010, finishing as the state runner up to Leeds. Since 2000, Hamilton has garnered eight unofficial state championships for power lifting. All Aggie athletic events take place at campus venues excluding golf, which competes at the Pikeville Country Club located south of Hamilton.

Hamilton High School's primary athletic program is football, which dates back to 1911 in the school. The Hamilton Aggie Football team is ranked eleventh in the state for overall wins (557-328-36), and has a winning percentage of 62.9%. The team have had eleven region championship seasons, seven undefeated regular seasons, and one appearance in the Super 6 3A State Championship Game in Jordan–Hare Stadium at Auburn University against the Leeds Greenwave. The team play their home games at Sargent Stadium, which has an approximate seating capacity of 3,500. In 2002, the Fred Coleman Sandlin fieldhouse was erected in the west endzone of Sargent Stadium. Hamilton has also maintained rivalries with the Winfield Pirates, which also compete in Region 5, and the Haleyville Lions of Winston County.

- 1929 (7-0-1)
- 1930 (6-0-1)
- 1978 (10-1; Class 3A R15; First Round)
- 1982 (11-1; Class 3A R15; Second Round)
- 1985 (10-2; Class 5A R16; Second Round)
- 1990 (10-3; Class 5A R14; State Quarterfinals)
- 1991 (9-2; Class 5A R14; First Round)
- 1994 (6-5; Class 4A R14; First Round)
- 1996 (9-2; Class 4A R15; First Round)
- 2008 (12-1; Class 3A R7; State Quarterfinals)
- 2009 (11-2; Class 3A R7; State Quarterfinals)
- 2010 (14-0; Class 3A R5; State Runner Up)
- 2012 (10-1; Class 3A R7; First Round)
- 2015 (6-7; Class 4A R5; Third Round)

== Aggie Band ==
Hamilton High School is also home to the Hamilton Aggie Band. The Marching Band performs at all Aggie football games, along with seasonal parades, community events and competitions. The Concert Bands perform at concerts and school events throughout the year. The Aggie Band has traveled to Walt Disney World to perform in the Magic Kingdom, Universal Orlando, and the Allstate Sugar Bowl in New Orleans, Louisiana. The band recently traveled with the Hamilton Aggies to Auburn, Alabama to perform at the AHSAA Super 6 3A Football State Championship at Jordan–Hare Stadium. The band has appeared on ABC 33/40 as the "Band of the Week," and appeared on ESPN performing in the streets of New Orleans a few hours before the 2011 Allstate Sugar Bowl. The 2011-2012 Marching Band traveled to Universal Orlando to perform in the CityWalk entertainment district, and for 2012-2013 the Aggie Band traveled to New York City where they performed on the Intrepid Sea, Air, and Space Museum. The Concert Band and Middle School both perform at the Alabama Bandmasters Music Performance Assessment and receive consistent superior ratings in festivals and contests.

== Notable alumni ==
- Jayden Loving, NFL defensive tackle for the Chicago Bears
