= Marion County – Rankin Fite Airport =

Coordinates: 34°07′03″N 087°59′54″W

Marion County - Rankin Fite Airport
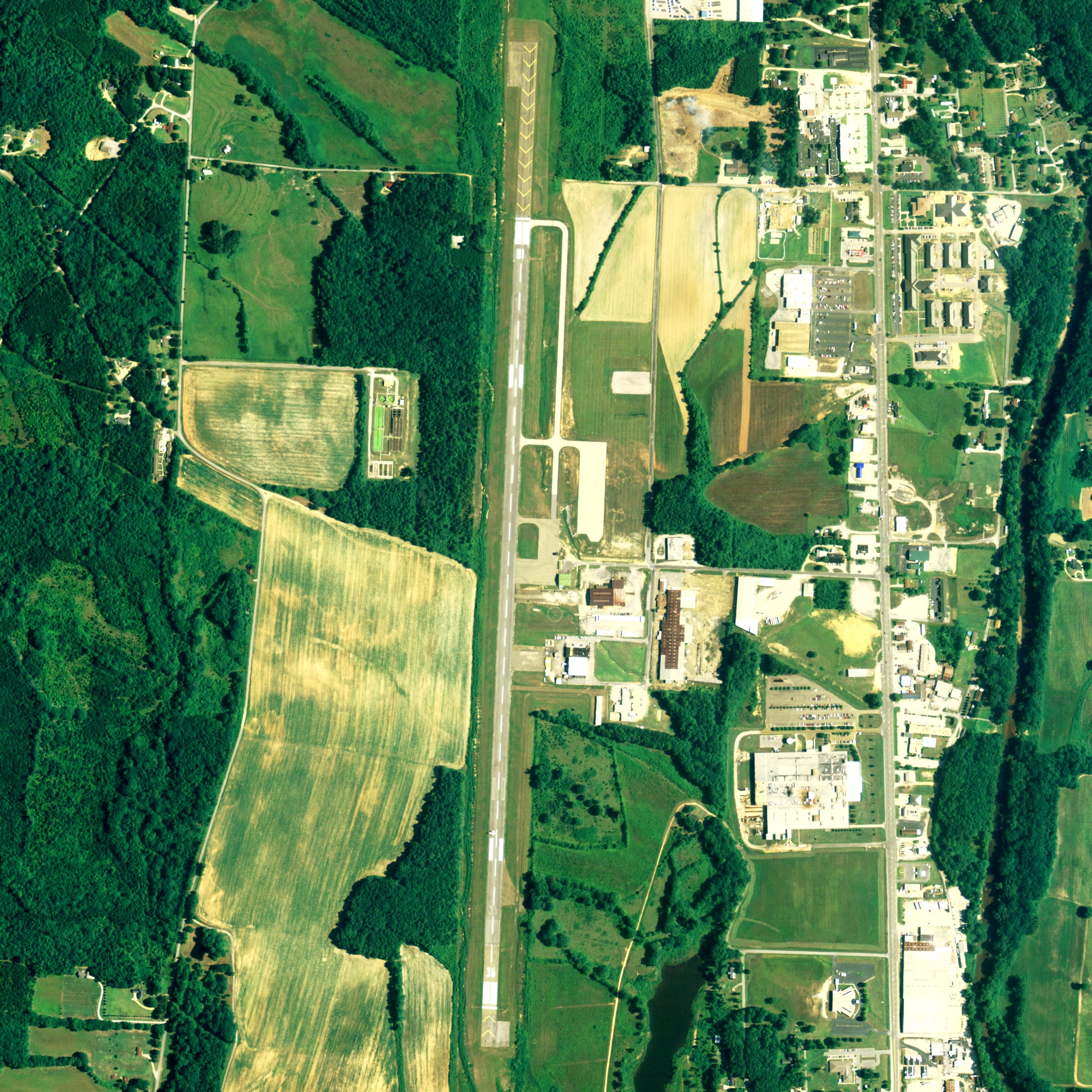
- IATA: HAB; ICAO: KHAB; FAA LID: HAB

Summary
- Airport type: Public
- Owner: Marion County
- Serves: Hamilton, Alabama
- Elevation AMSL: 442 ft / 135 m
- Interactive map of Marion County - Rankin Fite Airport

Runways
Direction	Length		Surface
Direction	ft	m	Surface
18/36	5,500	1,676	Asphalt

Statistics (2006)
- Aircraft operations: 21,800
- Source: Federal Aviation Administration

Marion County - Rankin Fite Airport (IATA: HAB, ICAO: KHAB, FAA LID: HAB) is a public airport located one mile (2 km) south of the central business district of Hamilton, a city in Marion County, Alabama, United States. It is owned by Marion County.

== Facilities and aircraft ==
Marion County – Rankin Fite Airport covers an area of 173 acres (70 ha) which contains one asphalt paved runway (18/36) measuring 5,500 x 100 ft (1,676 x 30 m). For the 12-month period ending August 23, 2006, the airport had 21,800 aircraft operations, 100% of which were general aviation.

== See also ==
- List of airports in Alabama
