= Pattern of Urlaur =

The Pattern of Urlaur is an annual festival held on 4 August at Urlaur, Kilmovee, County Mayo since medieval times, to remember the feast day of Saint Dominic.

== The Pattern ==
Patterns were a traditional feature of rural Ireland, held to honour patron saints; "Pattern" being a corruption of "patron".

The Pattern of Urlaur is held near the ruins of Urlaur Abbey. The Abbey was founded around 1430 by the Anglo-Norman Nangle family for the Dominicans, and was dedicated to St. Thomas Aquinas. It was built overlooking the banks of Loch Urlaur, but was destroyed in 1654 by Cromwellian soldiers.

Each year on 4 August, the traditional Feast Day of St Dominic, the people of the area gather to celebrate Mass in the "Abbey". The annual 'Pattern Day' starts with a concelebrated Mass in the Abbey, followed by music, sports, novelty events etc.

At the Pattern, traditional food items can be purchased, like dilisk (duileasc), a seaweed.

Douglas Hyde's 1915 collection of Legends of Saints and Sinners contains a tale called "the Friars of Urlaur" that describes the difficulty they had with an evil spirit, disguised as a black boar, that dwelt in the Loch Urlaur.
