= Marion County Schools (Alabama) =

School district in Alabama, United States

Marion County Schools is a school district in Marion County, Alabama, headquartered in Hamilton.

== Schools ==
=== High Schools ===
- Brilliant School (7-12 Campus)
- Hackleburg High School
- Hamilton High School
- Marion County High School
- Phillips High School

=== Middle Schools ===
- Brilliant School (7-12 Campus)
- Hamilton Middle School

=== Elementary Schools ===
- Brilliant School (K-6 Campus)
- Guin Elementary School
- Hackleburg Elementary School
- Hamilton Elementary School
- Phillips Elementary School
