= Flowering Sunday =

Welsh day of memorial

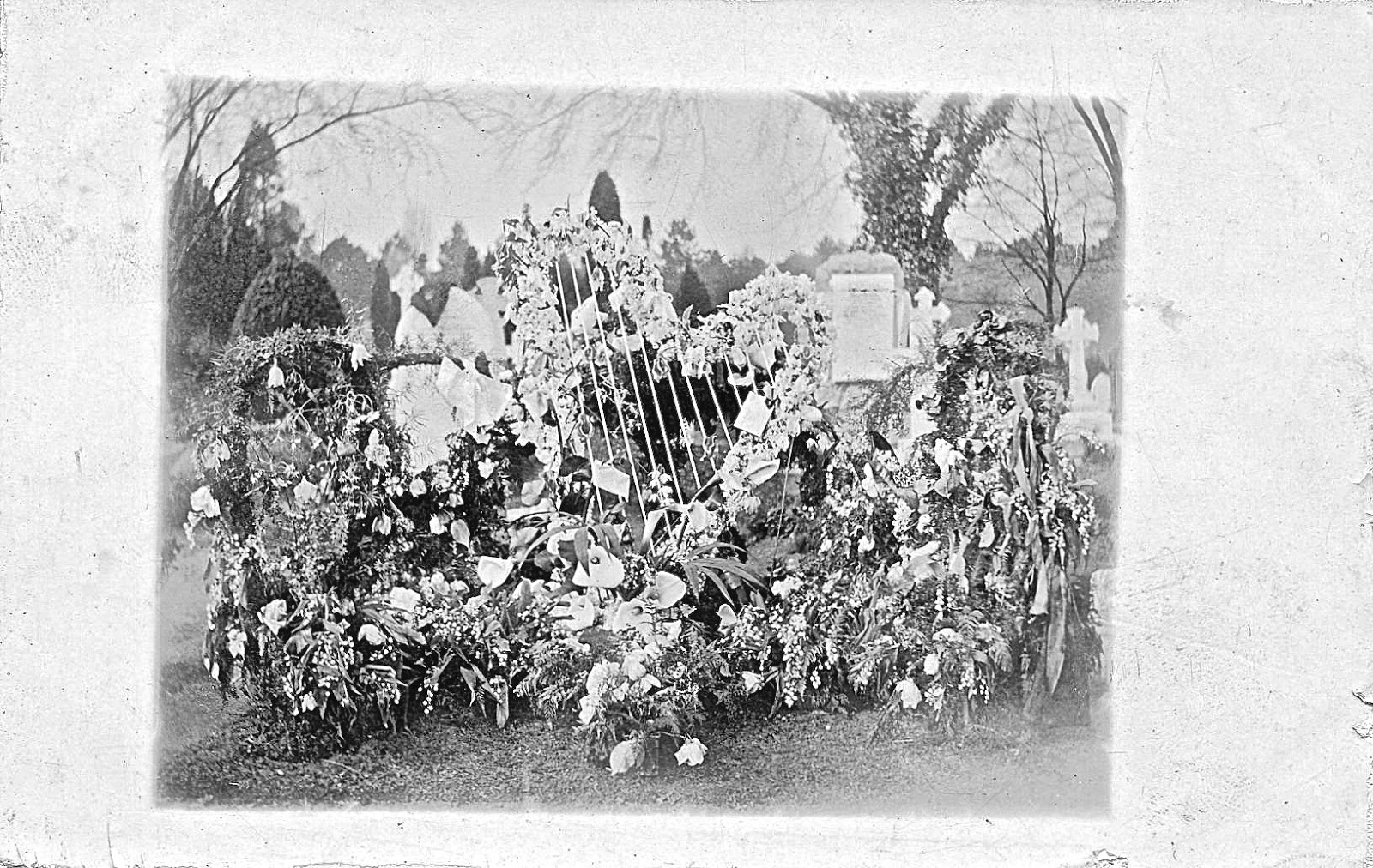
These flowering Sunday grave decorations were photographed in South Wales circa 1907

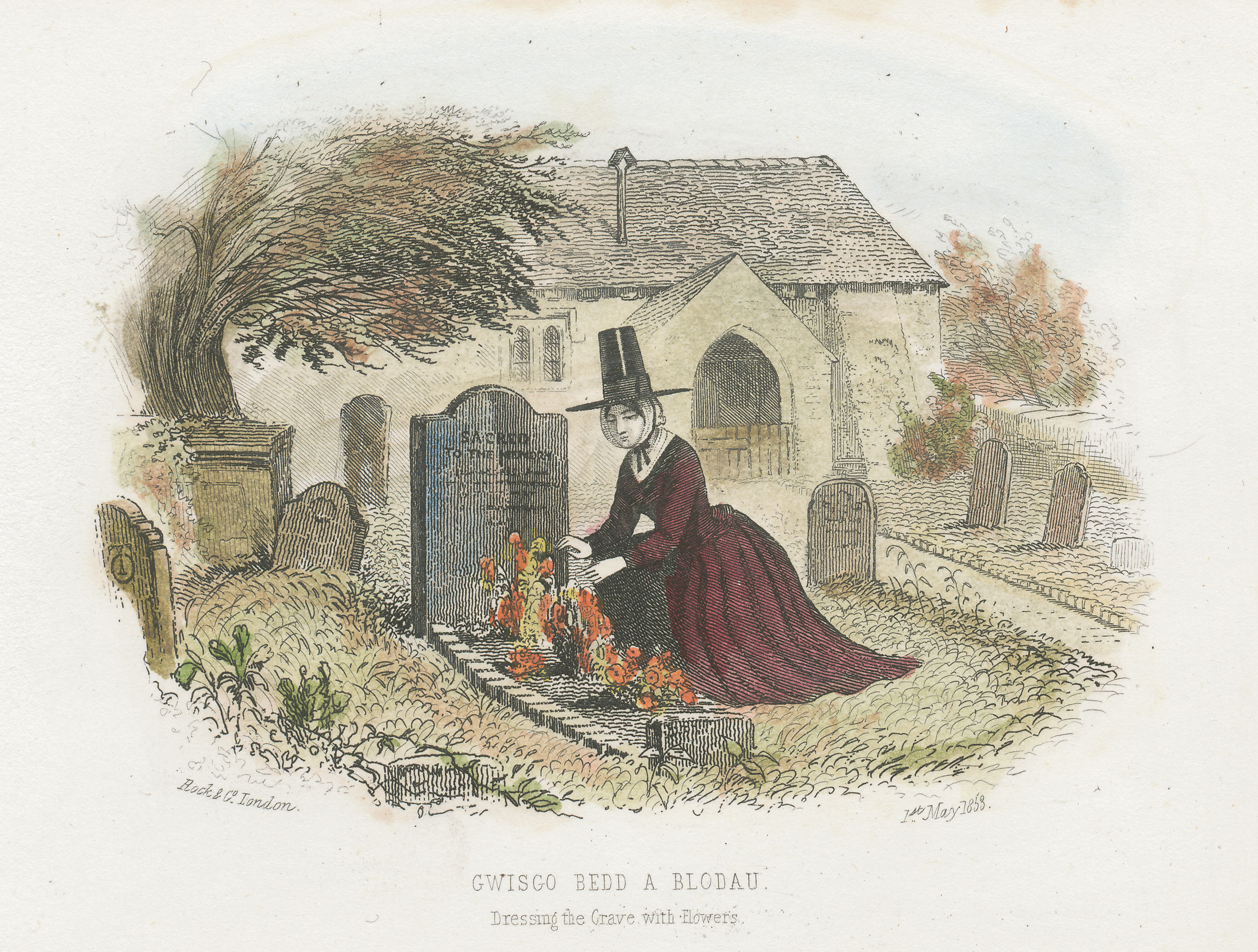
A depiction of 19th century Welsh cemetery decoration practices from 1853 by the artist Thomas Onwyn

In Wales and nearby portions of England, Sul y Blodau or Flowering Sunday is a grave decoration tradition commonly observed on Palm Sunday, although historically Flowering Sunday grave decoration was also observed on other days as well. It is traditional to whitewash and decorate graves with flowers on Flowering Sunday. Today, the names Palm Sunday and Flowering Sunday are used interchangeably in Wales. Scholars Alan and Karen Jabbour have postulated that Flowering Sunday might be connected to Appalachian and Liberian Decoration Day cemetery traditions. Flowering Sunday is also known as Blossom Sunday in some portions of England.

== History of Welsh cemetery decoration ==
Flowering Sunday cemetery cleaning and decoration traditions may have begun as an Easter celebration or seasonal rite before becoming more commonly associated with Palm Sunday. According to historical documentation gathered by Early Tourists in Wales, there are two distinct but related Welsh cemetery decoration traditions relating to the placing of flowers and other plants. The first cemetery decoration tradition involves decorating the grave immediately after burial and then at intervals afterwards, meaning that flowers could be seen in church and cathedral graveyards throughout the year.

All the evidence suggests that this custom was practiced over most of Wales probably as early as the 17th century and definitely during the 18th and 19th centuries. There are very few customs and traditions which can be shown to have been so widespread in Wales at this time.

According to the "Early Tourists in Wales project", Flowering Sunday is the second cemetery decoration tradition which is today practiced on the Saturday before Palm Sunday (Sul y Blodau in Welsh, literally ‘flowers Sunday’ but often translated as ‘flowering Sunday’). As with the first cemetery decoration tradition, graves are cleaned or whitewashed and then decorated. Contemporary accounts indicate that Flowering Sunday became widespread in southeast Wales and nearby parts of England beginning in the mid-19th century.

=== Earliest recorded practices ===
Evidence suggests that before 1800 flowers were put on graves on Easter Sunday in some parts of Wales. Edward Williams (Iolo Morganwg, 1747-1826) and others recorded cemetery decoration during other times of the year on Whit Sunday, St. John the Baptist's Day, and Christmas Day.

As early as 1786, cleaning and flower decorations were attested by William Matthews during a tour of South Wales. Richard Warner attested in 1797 "the ornamenting of the graves of the deceased with various plants and flowers, at certain seasons, by the surviving relatives" and noted that Easter was the most popular time for this tradition. By 1803, Malkin's observations reflect the shift away predominantly associating the custom with Easter:

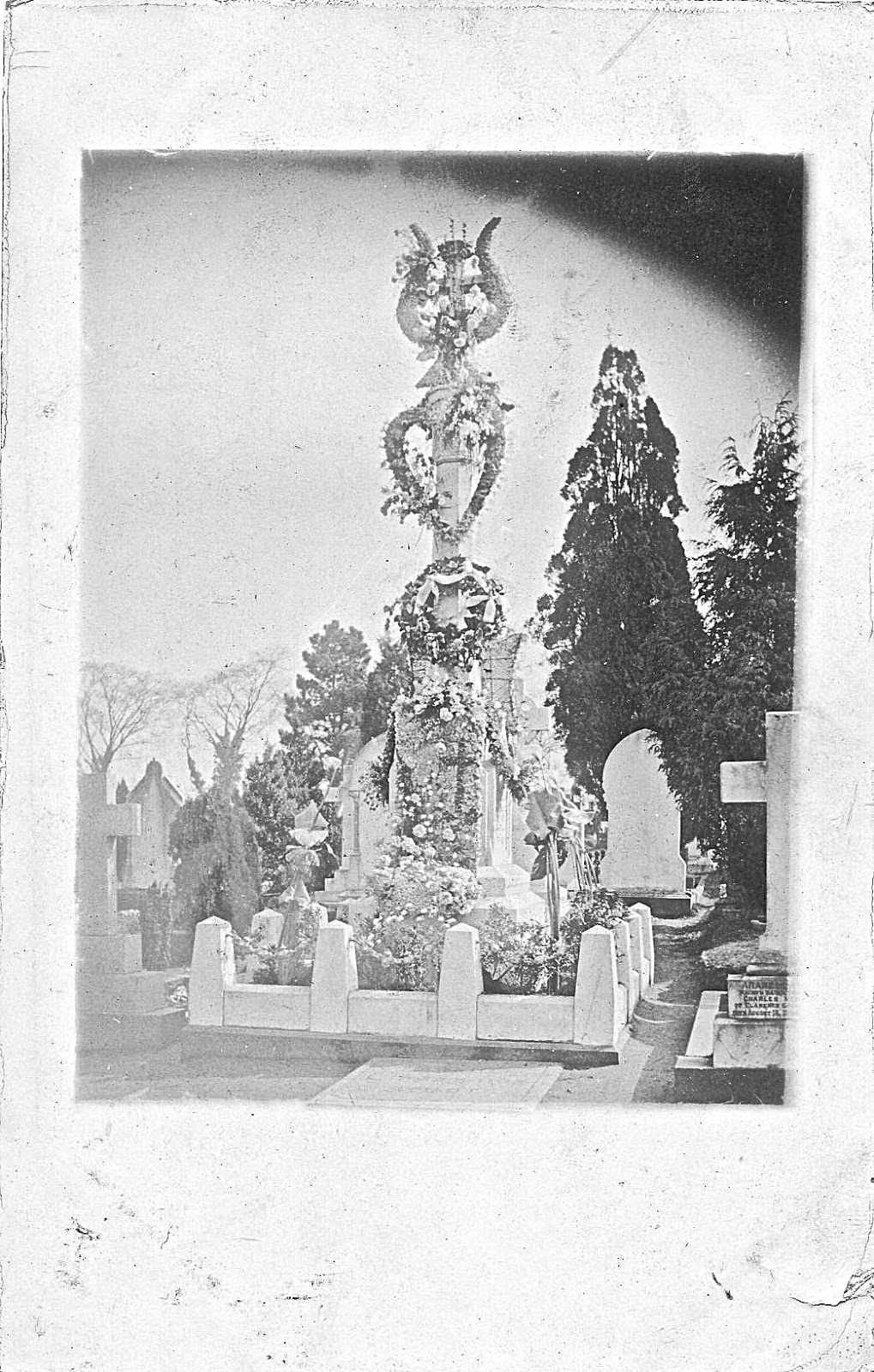
These flowering Sunday grave decorations were photographed in South Wales circa 1907

It is very common to dress the graves on Whitsunday and other festivals, when flowers are to be procured. The stones at each end of the grave are whitened with lime every Christmas, Easter and Whitsun. In the Easter week most generally the graves are newly dressed, and manured with fresh earth, when such flowers or ever-greens as may be wanted or wished for are planted. In the Whitsuntide Holidays, or rather the preceding week, the graves are again looked after, weeded, and otherwise dressed, or, if necessary, planted again.

Peter Roberts characterized these practices in 1815: "In many parts, and especially in South Wales, the friends of the deceased take much and laudable pains to deck the grave with flowers. A bordering of slate or stones, is nicely run around it, and the top bound in by stones, laid with taste, in a tessellated manner, which has an ornamental effect..."

In 1829 Thomas Wallace, of Llanbadoc, Monmouthshire, published a poem which contains the first known reference to the custom being practiced only on Palm Sunday. By 1839, Charles Redwood referred to this tradition of cleaning and decorating graves on Palm Sunday as the "old custom": "All the village were there, engaged, after the old custom, in trimming and adorning the graves of their deceased relatives. Some were raising the sides with fresh turf, and putting fresh earth upon the surface; and others whitewashed the stones at the ends; while the women planted rosemary and rue, and the girls brought baskets of spring flowers, crocuses, daffodils and primroses, which were placed in somewhat fantastic figures upon all the graves."

== Popularity in the late 1800s ==
During the second half of the 19th century, newspapers reported on large crowds visiting cemeteries: 10,000 visited the new cemetery in Cardiff in 1879 which increased to 20,000 in 1889 and 50,000 in 1898. 25,000 people were observed at Swansea cemetery on Flowering Sunday in 1906.

== Modern practice ==
Flowering Sunday practices spread during the early 20th century to the majority of Wales and bordering parts of England. In the 21st century, Flowering Sunday is still practiced in Wales but artificial flowers and other changes in decoration practice mean that many graves are decorated throughout the year. Christmas has also been attested as an active period for modern Welsh cemetery decoration.

== See also ==
- Cemetery Sunday
- Decoration Day (Appalachia and Liberia)
