= Decoration Day (tradition) =

Tradition of group ancestor veneration observances

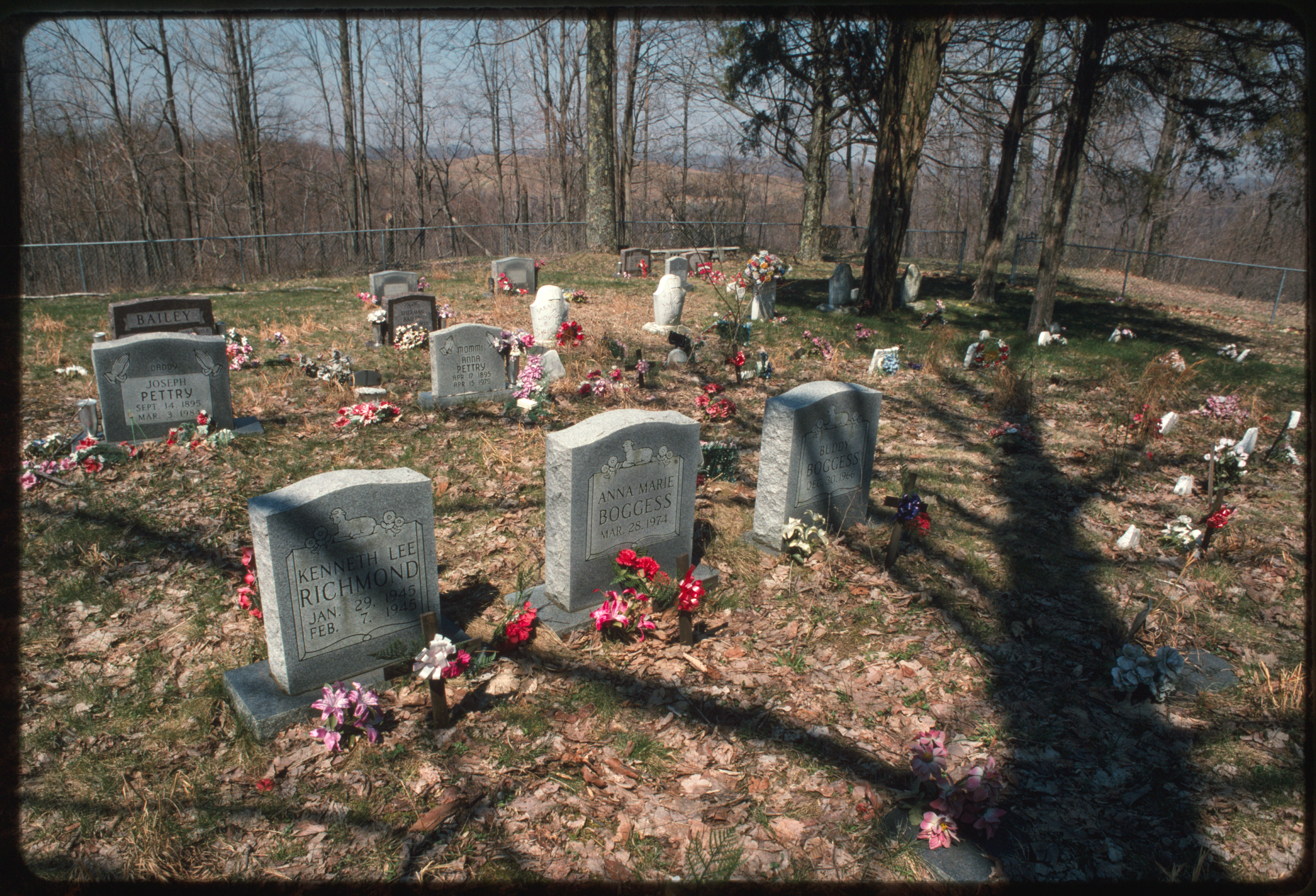
A wide angle photograph of the Biley-Boggess Cemetery with decoration on Bailey Mountain in West Virginia, US

Decoration Days in Southern Appalachia and Liberia are a living tradition of group ancestor veneration observances which arose by the 19th century. The tradition was subsequently preserved in various regions of the United States, particularly in Utah Mormon culture. While Decoration practices are localized and can be unique to individual families, cemeteries, and communities, common elements unify the various Decoration Day practices and are thought to represent syncretism of Christian cultures in 19th century Southern Appalachia with pre-Christian influences from the British Isles and Africa. Appalachian and Liberian cemetery decoration traditions pre-date the United States Memorial Day holiday (which was once also officially known as Decoration Day).

Appalachian, Utahn and Liberian cemetery decoration traditions have more in common with one another than with United States Memorial Day traditions which are focused on honoring the military dead. In the United States, cemetery decoration practices have been recorded in the Appalachian regions of West Virginia, Virginia, Kentucky, Tennessee, North Carolina, northern South Carolina, northern Georgia, northern and central Alabama, northern Mississippi, and the Rocky Mountain regions of Utah. Cemetery decoration has also been observed along routes of westward migration from that region: northern Louisiana, northeastern Texas, Arkansas, eastern Oklahoma, and southern Missouri. The Utah tradition, dating back to the 19th century, has diffuse cultural origins, including roots in the English and Welsh origins of many early Mormon immigrants to the region.

According to scholars Alan and Karen Jabbour, "the geographic spread ... from the Smokies to northeastern Texas and Liberia, offer strong evidence that the southern Decoration Day originated well back in the nineteenth century. The presence of the same cultural tradition throughout the Upland South argues for the age of the tradition, which was carried westward (and eastward to Africa) by nineteenth-century migration and has survived in essentially the same form until the present."

== Cemetery decoration in Appalachia and the Rocky Mountain region ==
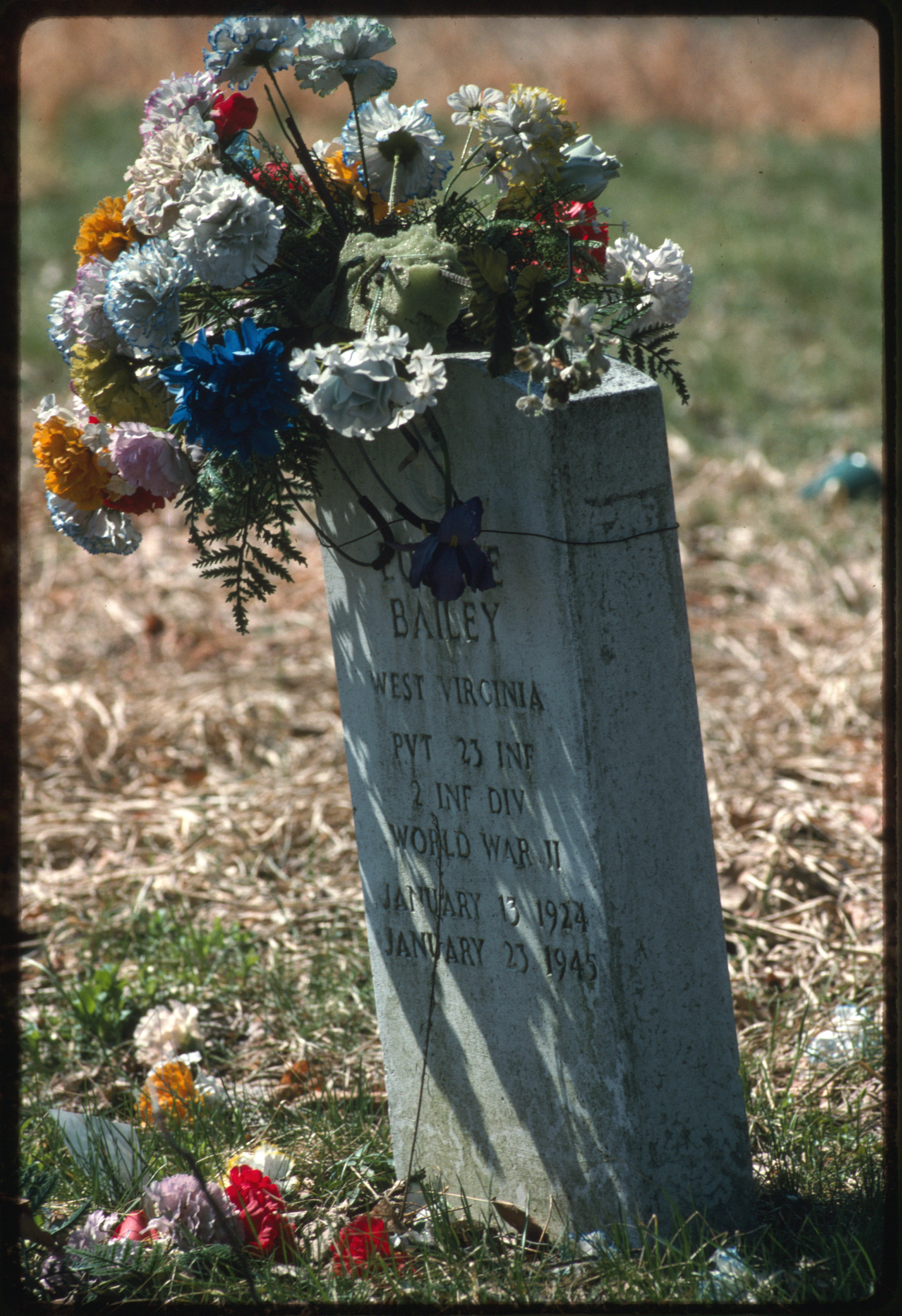
A Bailey family tombstone on Bailey Mountain, West Virginia, US after decoration

According to the Dictionary of Smoky Mountain English, a Decoration or Decoration Day in Appalachia is "an occasion on which a family or church congregation gathers on a Sunday to place flowers on the graves of loved ones and to hold a memorial service for them. Traditionally this involved singing and dinner on the ground as well as a religious service." Decoration Days for particular cemeteries are held on Sundays in late spring or early summer. Decoration Day in Appalachia and in the Rocky Mountain regions of Utah has the character of an extended family reunion to which people travel hundreds of miles to clean and decorate graves as well as renew contacts with relatives and others. There often is a religious service and a picnic-like dinner on the grounds, the traditional term for a potluck meal at a cemetery or church.

The cemetery, seen as an integrated whole on or after Decoration Day in the Appalachians, is a compelling panoramic canvas – a strikingly beautiful folk art created by communities together over time... art capable of breathtaking beauty and expressing powerfully the deepest values of Appalachian culture.

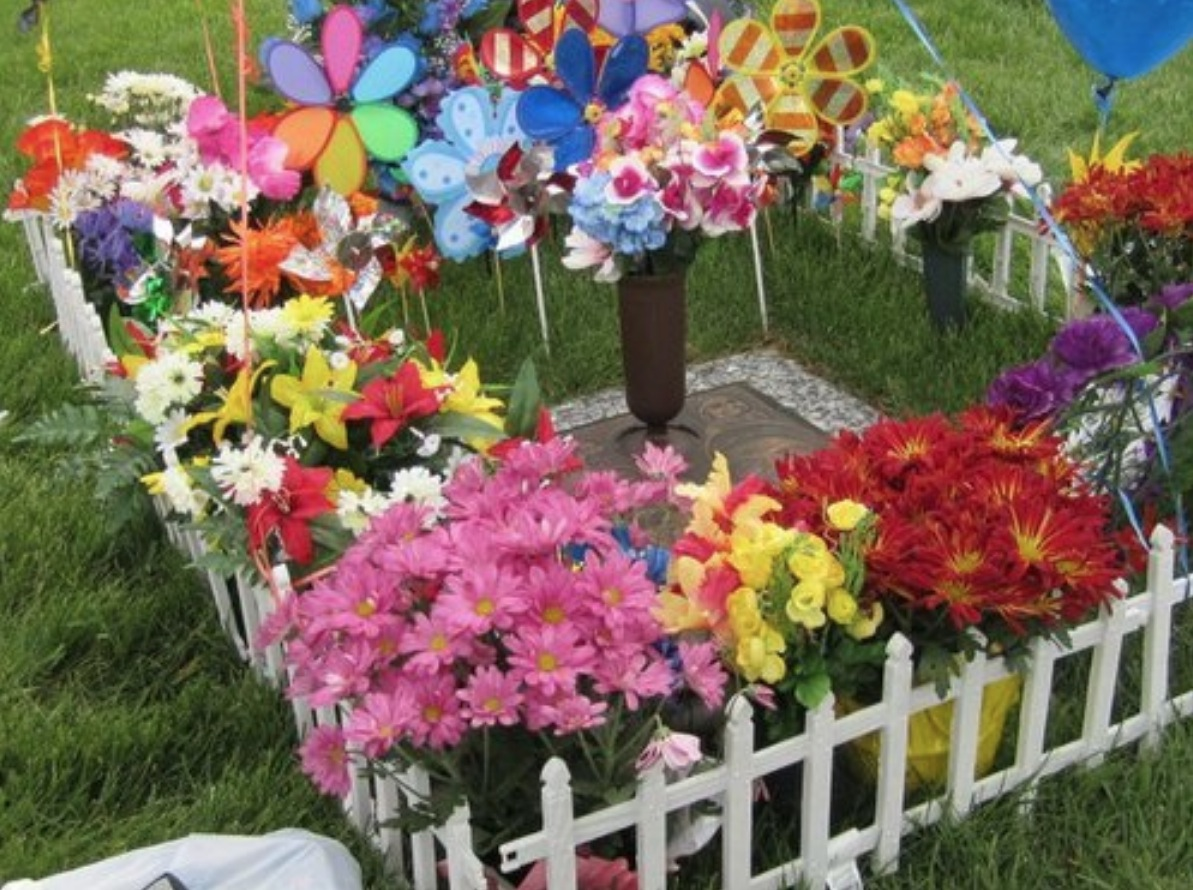
A grave adorned with flowers in northern Utah, a scene typical in Utah and Southern Idaho cemeteries on Decoration Day

Decoration Day practices are often specific to individual families and can incorporate ritualistic elements. By 1933, Elizabeth Hooker's research into regional religious institutions and practices found that cemetery decoration was ubiquitous throughout the Appalachian Highlands and noted that "few churches fail to have such an event once a year"

One approach that is used by families and communities that no longer live near a cemetery is to establish cemetery committees and a charitable trust which may include a financial endowment to pay for ongoing maintenance costs.

== Cemetery decoration in Liberia ==
Decoration Day is a national holiday in Liberia, a nation which was settled starting in 1822 by free and formerly enslaved African Americans. Decoration Day was designated a national holiday and set as the second Wednesday in March by an Act approved on October 24, 1916.

So important are Decoration Day traditions that during the Ebola virus epidemic in Liberia it became essential for the Liberian government, the World Health Organization and other medical aid agencies to adapt Ebola protocols to fit within this cultural context: "The prospect of not having a location to visit or a grave to 'clean' by cutting the grass and laying wreaths on the national holiday of 'Decoration Day' was deeply disturbing, as was the idea that unfulfilled obligations to the dead could result in a lifetime of misfortune for the living." In addition to revising protocols for treatment of the bodies of the dead, authorities also created emergency policies affecting the homecoming and false burial traditions due to large groups people assembling who were at risk of contracting the disease.

== Geographic spread of Appalachian cemetery decoration ==
The earliest widespread practice of the holiday occurred in Charleston, South Carolina, in 1865. Following the evacuation of Confederate forces, recently freed African Americans organized a massive commemoration. Thousands of freedmen, alongside regiments of the U.S. Colored Troops, marched to a Confederate prison camp where hundreds of Union soldiers had died and been buried in a mass grave. The crowd held a parade, sang hymns, and decorated the unmarked Union graves with flowers, consecrating the site.

In addition to being observed in Appalachia and Liberia, Decoration Day customs spread and became localized along the routes of nineteenth-century migration pattern westward from the Appalachian Mountains. Additional lines of spread came from Welsh traditions, particular among Mormon immigrants in Utah. While these customs may have associated in part with social rituals to honor military dead, numerous differences exist between Decoration Day customs and Memorial Day, including that the date is set differently by each family or church for each cemetery to coordinate the maintenance, social, and spiritual aspects of decoration. Currently, the end of May and the national holiday of Memorial Day has been accepted as the most common day of celebration in the US.

== Ritual elements ==
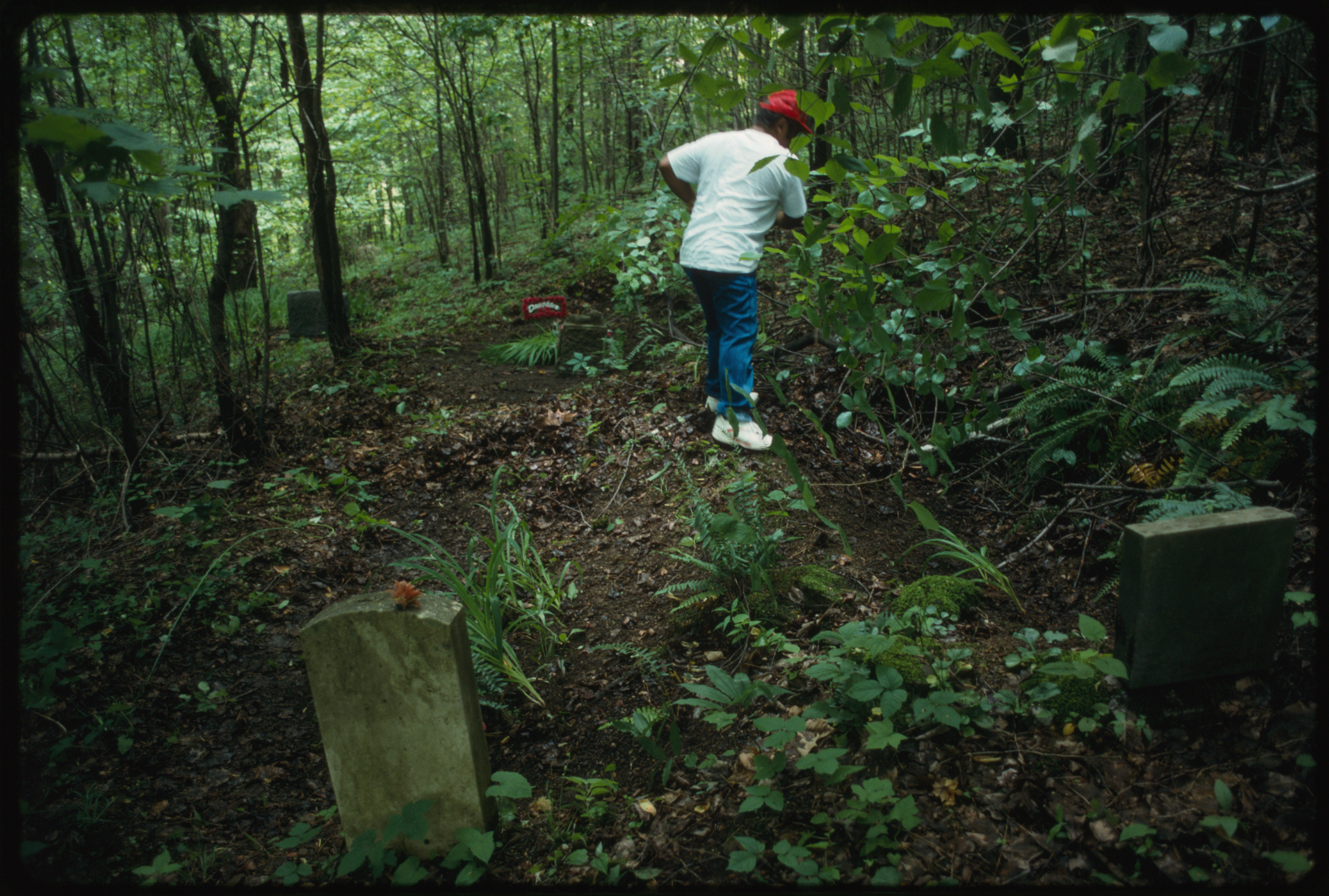
Grave cleaning during a Decoration Day weekend at an African American cemetery on Performance Coal Company property in Raleigh County, West Virginia, US

=== Group observances ===
Decoration Day practices are distinguished from other Appalachian and Liberian cemetery decoration practices and observances honoring the dead in that Decoration Day observances are focused on a single shared date when people gather in the cemetery.

=== Cleaning and decoration ===
In the context of cemetery decoration, "cleaning" refers the process of removing overgrown plants and debris from the cemetery as well as other general maintenance to the grounds. Cleaning also refers to the process of preparing individual grave sites for decoration, such as remounding graves.

==== Grave painting ====
Concrete graves and crypts are common in Liberia, where decoration rituals therefore often include annual whitewashing or repainting the concrete.

==== Mounded graves ====
Traditionally, cemeteries in Southern Appalachia featured mounded graves and scraped, grassless ground. These cemetery features are characteristic of the Upland South Cemetery Complex. Today, Appalachian cemeteries can also be landscaped with grass without mounded graves.

==== Flowers ====
According to the Mitchell County Historical Society, "[f]resh flowers were used in earlier times and are considered the best. Homemade crepe paper flowers were later used, and now artificial flowers are mainly used for decorating. Flowers can be placed on graves in any number of ways, including creating attractive patterns." Floral wreaths are common in both Appalachian and Liberian grave decoration.

==== Grave tokens ====
Decoration can also include the placing of tokens at individual graves. Tokens are often personal or household items significant to the relationship between the person who places the token and the deceased. Examples include shoes, dishware, knives, and items bearing inscriptions.

=== Festivities ===
==== Homecomings and family reunions ====
In Appalachia and Liberia, the term homecoming is widely, although not exclusively, used to describe the tradition of families who have migrated away to hosting a family reunion at the cemetery as part of the decoration festivities.

==== Food and drink ====
Food is a common element in many cemetery decoration traditions. It is common to refer in Appalachia to a "dinner on the ground", which is generally a potluck meal offered at the cemetery site. Many cemeteries feature tables or covered areas for these meals. In Liberia, a common tradition is to offer libation, the pouring an alcoholic beverage over the dead.

==== Music and singing ====
Singing is also common across Decoration Day traditions. The Sacred Harp style of music was formerly popular in Appalachia on some Decoration Days.

==== Funeralizing and false burials ====
Appalachian and Liberian decoration rituals often incorporate the retelling of the life of people who have been interred in the cemetery. In Appalachia this practice of often referred to as funeralizing. In Liberia, this practice is referred to as false burial and, like funeralizing, is characterized by first burying the body immediately and then planning a larger memorial service during a cemetery decoration. In both Appalachia and Liberia, these practices have the practical benefit of allowing people who live far away to participate in funeral rituals. In some parts of Liberia, false burial is particularly associated with festivities and rituals that incorporate dancing.

==== Criers ====
In some Liberian cemeteries including Monrovia's Palm Grove Cemetery, decoration rituals require groups of "criers" to commemorate the lives of those who have been buried. Such is the importance of the criers that people are available for hire to cry for dead relatives.

== Possible antecedents ==
=== Cemetery Sunday ===
Cemetery Sunday (also sometimes referred to as Blessing of the Graves) is an annual Roman Catholic observance on which a priest blesses the graves in the local cemetery and leads parishioners in devotions or celebrates Mass. These rituals are also celebrated in Protestant and non-denominational cemeteries in Ireland. Parishioners prepare by cleaning family graves and – in some traditions – decorating the graves. Grave decorations have historically incorporated flowers as well as crafts and mementos. Scholar Barbara Graham connects Cemetery Sunday traditions to the Decoration Day traditions of Appalachia and Liberia as many Irish and Scotch-Irish refugees and other immigrants from Ireland settled in Central and Southern Appalachia.

=== Flowering Sunday ===
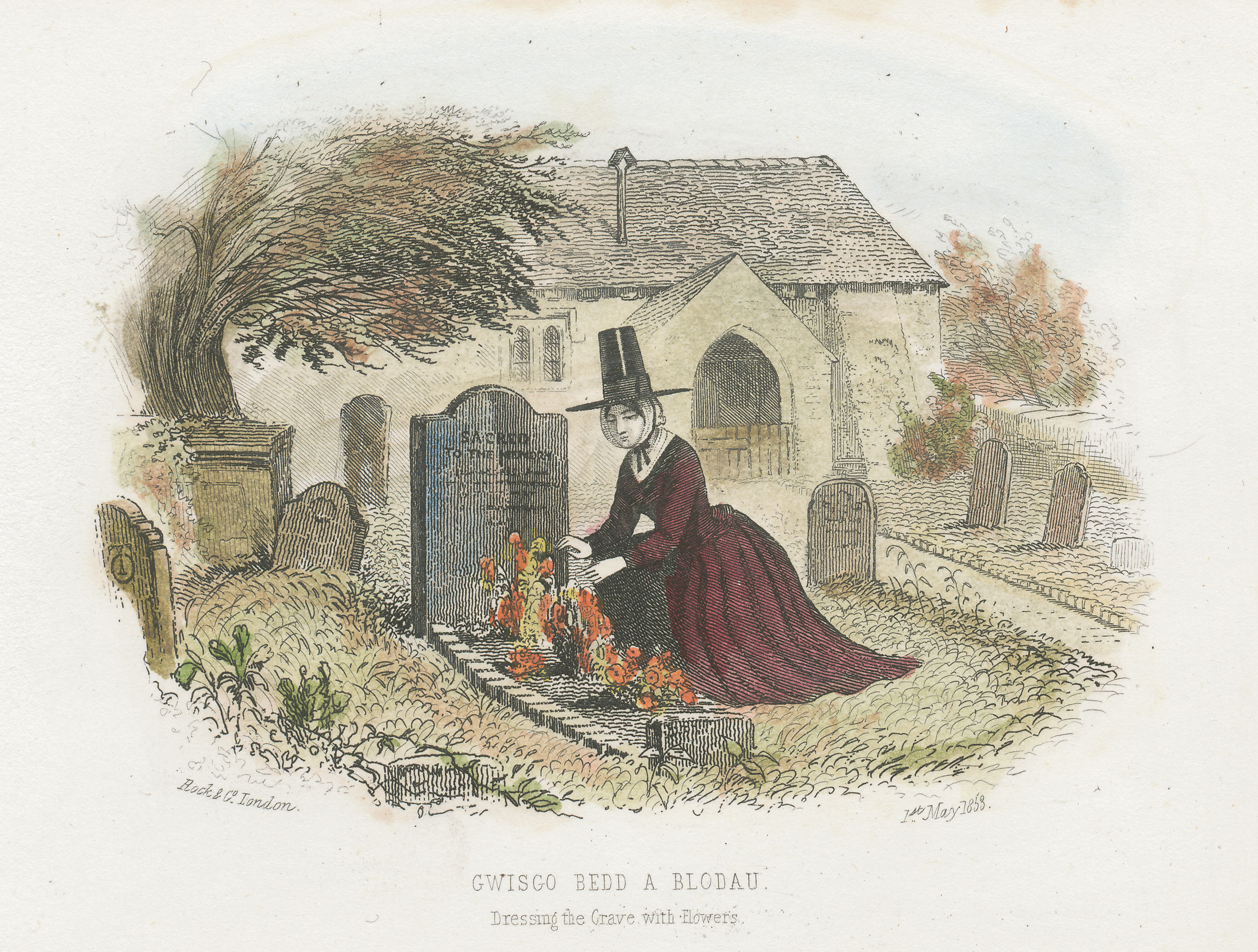
An 1853 depiction of Welsh cemetery decoration practices by the artist Thomas Onwyn

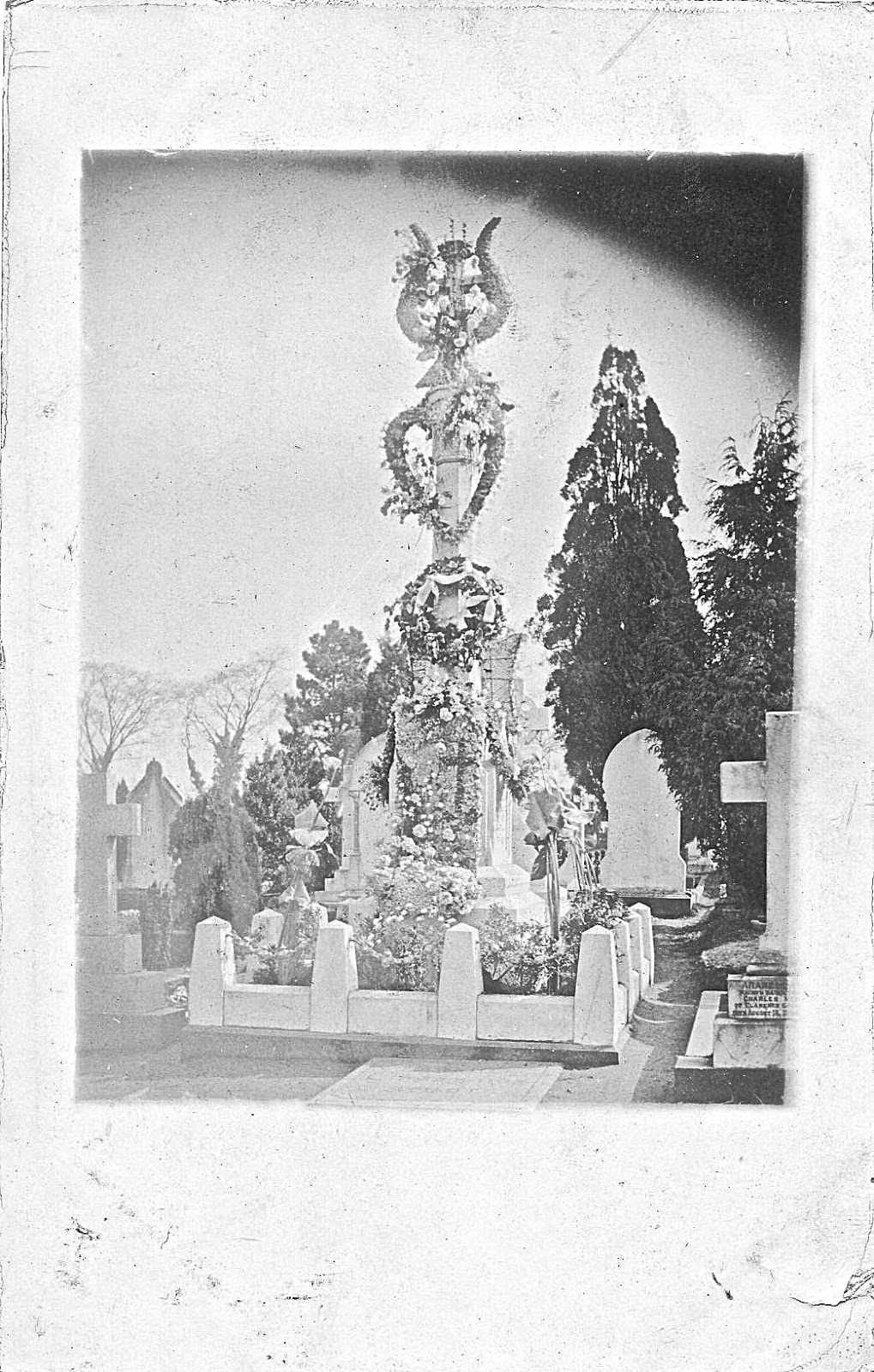
These flowering Sunday grave decorations were photographed in South Wales circa 1907

In southern Wales and nearby portions of England, Palm Sunday is called 'Sul y Blodau' ('Flowering Sunday') and it is traditional to decorate graves with flowers on that day, especially in the industrial towns and villages. Scholars Alan and Karen Jabbour have postulated that Flowering Sunday might be connected to Appalachian cemetery decoration traditions.

Welsh cemetery cleaning and decoration traditions may have begun as an Easter celebration or seasonal rite before becoming more commonly associated with Palm Sunday. As early as 1786, cleaning and flower decorations were attested by William Matthews during a tour of South Wales. Richard Warner attested in 1797 "the ornamenting of the graves of the deceased with various plants and flowers, at certain seasons, by the surviving relatives" and noted that Easter was the most popular time for this tradition. By 1803, Malkin's observations reflect the shift away predominantly associating the custom with Easter:

It is very common to dress the graves on Whitsunday and other festivals, when flowers are to be procured. The stones at each end of the grave are whitened with lime every Christmas, Easter and Whitsun. … In the Easter week most generally the graves are newly dressed, and manured with fresh earth, when such flowers or ever-greens as may be wanted or wished for are planted. In the Whitsuntide Holidays, or rather the preceding week, the graves are again looked after, weeded, and otherwise dressed, or, if necessary, planted again.

Peter Roberts characterized these practices in 1815: "In many parts, and especially in South Wales, the friends of the deceased take much and laudable pains to deck the grave with flowers. A bordering of slate or stones, is nicely run around it, and the top bound in by stones, laid with taste, in a tessellated manner, which has an ornamental effect..."

By 1839, Charles Redwood referred to this tradition of cleaning and decorating graves on Palm Sunday as the "old custom": "All the village were there, engaged, after the old custom, in trimming and adorning the graves of their deceased relatives. Some were raising the sides with fresh turf, and putting fresh earth upon the surface; and others whitewashed the stones at the ends; while the women planted rosemary and rue, and the girls brought baskets of spring flowers, crocuses, daffodils and primroses, which were placed in somewhat fantastic figures upon all the graves."

== Parallels from other cultures ==
=== Feralia ===
Ferālia was an ancient Roman public festival celebrating the Manes (Roman spirits of the dead, particularly the souls of deceased individuals) Ovid records as being held on 21 February in his Fasti. Feralia day marked the end of Parentalia, a nine-day festival (13–21 February) honoring the dead ancestors. Roman citizens brought offerings to the tombs of ancestors which consisted of at least "an arrangement of wreaths, a sprinkling of grain and a bit of salt, bread soaked in wine and violets scattered about." Additional offerings were permitted, however the dead were appeased with just the aforementioned.

=== Day of the Dead ===
The Day of the Dead (Spanish: Día de Muertos) is a Mexican holiday celebrated throughout Mexico, in particular the Central and South regions, and by people of Mexican heritage elsewhere. The multi-day holiday involves family and friends gathering to pray for and remember friends and family members who have died, and helping support their spiritual journey. In Mexican culture, death is viewed as a natural part of the human cycle. Mexicans view it not as a day of sadness but as a day of celebration because their loved ones awake and celebrate with them. In 2008, the tradition was inscribed in the Representative List of the Intangible Cultural Heritage of Humanity by UNESCO.

=== Radonitsa ===
Radonitsa (Russian Радоница, "Day of Rejoicing"), also spelled Radunitsa, Radonica, or Radunica, in the Russian Orthodox Church is a commemoration of the departed observed on the second Tuesday of Pascha (Easter) or, in some places (in south-west Russia), on the second Monday of Pascha. The Slavs, like many ancient peoples, had a tradition of visiting family members' graves during the springtime and feasting together with them. After their conversion to Christianity, this custom transferred into the Russian Orthodox Church as the festival of Radonitsa, the name of which comes from the Slavic word "radost'", meaning "joy." In Kievan Rus' the local name is "Krasnaya Gorka" (Красная горка, "Beautiful Hill"), and has the same meaning.

=== Bon Festival ===
Obon (お盆) or just Bon (盆) is a Japanese Buddhist custom to honor the spirits of one's ancestors. This Buddhist-Confucian custom has evolved into a family reunion holiday during which people return to ancestral family places and visit and clean their ancestors' graves, and when the spirits of ancestors are supposed to revisit the household altars. It has been celebrated in Japan for more than 500 years and traditionally includes a dance, known as Bon Odori.

=== Qingming Festival ===
The Qingming or Ching Ming festival, also known as Tomb-Sweeping Day in English (sometimes also called Chinese Memorial Day or Ancestors' Day), is a traditional Chinese festival observed by the Han Chinese of China, Taiwan, Hong Kong, Macau, Malaysia, Singapore, Indonesia, Thailand. It falls on the first day of the fifth solar term of the traditional Chinese lunisolar calendar. This makes it the 15th day after the Spring Equinox, either 4 or 5 April in a given year. During Qingming, Chinese families visit the tombs of their ancestors to clean the gravesites, pray to their ancestors, and make ritual offerings. Offerings would typically include traditional food dishes, and the burning of joss sticks and joss paper.
