= Hurricane Rita tornado outbreak =

2005 tornado outbreak associated with Hurricane Rita

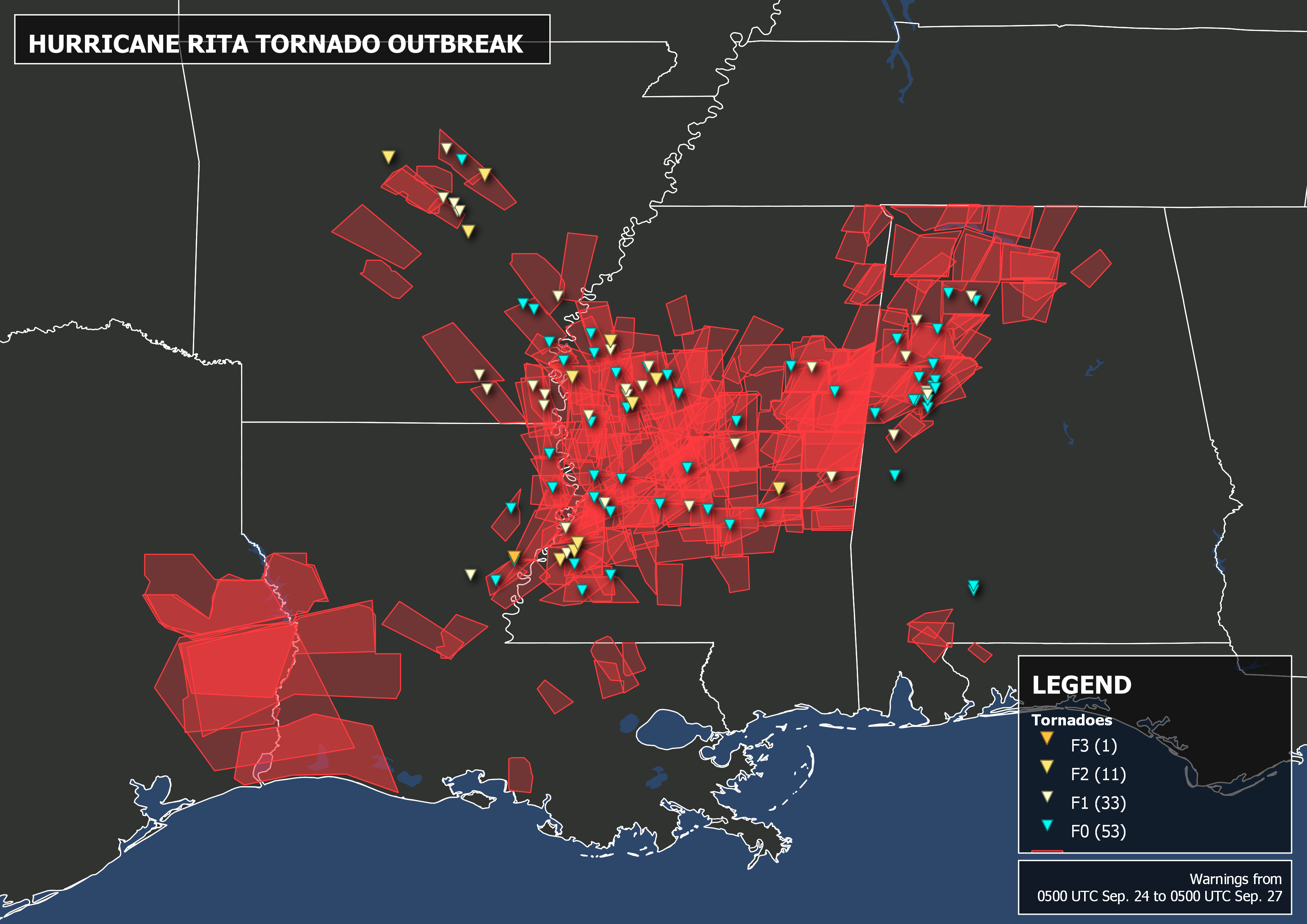
- Map of confirmed tornadoes and tornado warnings by the National Weather Service during the Hurricane Rita tornado outbreak

Tornado outbreak
- Tornadoes: 98
- Max. rating: F3 tornado
- Duration: September 24–26, 2005

Overall effects
- Fatalities: 1
- Injuries: 23
- Damage: $18.373 million (2005 USD)
- Areas affected: Louisiana, Mississippi
- Part of the tornadoes of 2005 and Hurricane Rita

From September 24–26, 2005, a significant tornado outbreak and severe weather event resulting from the remnants of Hurricane Rita dropped 98 tornadoes over Louisiana and Mississippi, killing one person. The event was the fourth-largest tornado outbreak caused by a tropical cyclone in recorded history. After the hurricane made landfall on the extreme southwestern coast of Louisiana on September 24, the tropical cyclone's strong rainbands affected much of the West South Central and East South Central States, producing heavy rainfall in addition to numerous tornadoes. Tornadic activity was distributed roughly evenly from September 24–25, though activity shifted slightly eastward on September 25. The severe activity ended by September 26, by which time the remnants of Hurricane Rita were absorbed by a frontal boundary.

As a result of Hurricane Rita, 98 tornadoes were confirmed over nearly a two-day period. Most of the tornadoes occurred in Mississippi, where 49 tornadoes were confirmed. With forty-four tornadoes in a single day, this is tied for the largest tornado outbreak in state history in a single day. The strongest tornado throughout the outbreak was an F3 tornado which struck areas of southeastern Louisiana late on September 24, injuring three people. Despite the large number of tornadoes, only one death resulted, which occurred as a result of an F1 tornado in Mississippi on September 24. However, another F1 tornado near Starkville, Mississippi injured seven people on September 25 making it the tornado with the most injuries during the outbreak. The same tornado was also the costliest, causing $2 million in damages. Overall, tornadoes during the outbreak killed one person and injured 23, and caused $18.373 million in damages.

== Background and meteorological synopsis ==
Hurricane Rita developed from a tropical wave north of Hispaniola on September 18. Tracking westward, it attained hurricane status while passing through the Straits of Florida. Abnormally warm sea surface temperatures over the Loop Current fueled rapid intensification, and Rita became a Category 5 hurricane on the Saffir-Simpson scale on September 21, the highest rating on the scale. At 09:00 pm that night (Note: Central daylight time, 03:00 Coordinated Universal Time), Rita reached its peak intensity with maximum sustained winds of 180 mph (290 km/h) and a minimum barometric pressure of 895 mbar (hPa; 26.43 inHg), making it the strongest tropical cyclone recorded in the Gulf of Mexico, as well as the fourth-strongest tropical cyclone recorded in the entirety of the Atlantic basin. The hurricane weakened as it approached the northern gulf coast, and Rita made landfall in extreme southwestern Louisiana at 01:40 am on September 24 (Note: CDT, 07:40 UTC) with winds of 120 mph (195 km/h). Once inland, the hurricane weakened rapidly due to increasing wind shear, falling to tropical depression intensity over Arkansas by September 25. On the next day, Rita was absorbed by an approaching cold front over Illinois.

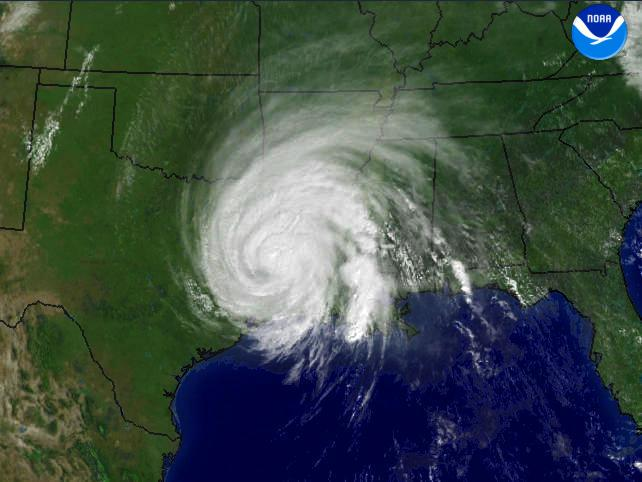
Hurricane Rita moving inland on September 24

The first indications that a potentially severe and tornadic event would result from Hurricane Rita were on September 22, when models showed that an area of wind shear located over East Texas would be favorable for tornadoes to develop from the hurricane's rainbands. The Storm Prediction Center (SPC) posted a slight risk for severe weather for the region in their Day 3 Severe Thunderstorm Outlook issued at 0738 UTC on September 22. The slight risk area was expanded to include areas of Louisiana and Mississippi the following day, as the SPC noted the possibility of tornadoes forming within small supercells embedded within Rita's rainbands. During the first day of the tornado outbreak, the slight risk region was further expanded to account for Rita's expanding wind field.

The tornado outbreak began on September 24 and continued into the next day, associated with the outer rainbands of the eastern edge of the landfalling hurricane. Over a 36 hour period, Mississippi experienced 44 tornadoes, setting a record for the most tornadoes over that time period. There were 55 tornadoes recorded within the Jackson, Mississippi National Weather Service's territory, becoming the largest outbreak in the office's history.

== List of tornadoes ==
List of tornadoes produced by Hurricane Rita
F#	Location	County / Parish	State	Start coord.	Date	Time (CST)	Path length	Max width	Summary
F0	NE of McCall Creek	Franklin	MS	31.56667°N 90.66667°W	September 24	08:15–08:16 a.m.	0.5 miles (0.80 km)	100 yards (91 m)	A weak tornado tore up a few trees, resulting in $10,000 in damage.
F0	NW of Utica	Hinds	MS	32.15°N 90.66667°W	September 24	10:14–10:15 a.m.	2 miles (3.2 km)	75 yards (69 m)	A weak tornado uprooted up a few trees and snapped branches, causing $20,000 in crop damage.
F1	W of Hubbard	Hinds	MS	32.21667°N 90.7333°W	September 24	10:20–10:22 a.m.	3 miles (4.8 km)	75 yards (69 m)	A tornado touched down near the Big Black River west of Hubbard. It moved to the north-northwest, clipping a portion of Claiborne County before entering Warren County. At its peak, the twister was an F1 in Warren County, before dissipating south of Bovina. The tornado damaged several trees along its path, resulting in $30,000 in damage.
F1	NW of Hamburg	Ashley	AR	33.26667°N 91.8°W	September 24	11:40–11:47 a.m.	7 miles (11 km)	100 yards (91 m)	A tornado hit just northwest of Hamburg and moved to the northwest, knocking down trees and power lines. Damage reached $175,000.
F1	N of Eudora	Chicot	AR	33.26667°N 91.8°W	September 24	11:51–11:52 a.m.	7 miles (11 km)	100 yards (91 m)	A tornado touched down in an open field north of Eudora. The twister flung debris and grass into an electrical station, closing it down. Damage totaled $300,000.
F1	N of Lacey	Drew	AR	33.4°N 91.86667°W	September 24	11:54 a.m.–12:01 a.m.	4.8 miles (7.7 km)	40 yards (37 m)	A tornado hit to the south-southwest of Lacey. Moving to the northwest, the twister snapped trees and damaged a house's television antenna and electric meter.
F0	W of Brownsville	Hinds	MS	32.45°N 90.56667°W	September 24	12:30–12:31 p.m.	0.7 miles (1.1 km)	50 yards (46 m)	A brief tornado snapped a few trees.
F2	SE of Greenville	Washington	MS	33.41667°N 91.06667°W	September 24	1:10–1:13 p.m.	2 miles (3.2 km)	300 yards (270 m)	A tornado touched down southeast of downtown Greenville, and moved to the north. After crossing U.S. Route 82, the tornado struck the Delta Village mobile home park before lifting. Along its path, the twister destroyed or severely damaged ten mobile homes, destroyed a barn, lifted the roof of a building, and 18 sheds damaged or destroyed. An antenna tower was blown over, as were numerous power lines and trees. Damage was estimated at $680,000.
F0	NNW of Arkansas City	Desha	AR	33.7°N 91.23333°W	September 24	1:45–2:00 p.m.	11 miles (18 km)	40 yards (37 m)	A tornado damaged a few buildings after it touched down near the Mississippi River, to the north-northwest of Arkansas City. Moving northwest, the twister also destroyed a carport and knocked down trees before dissipating.
F0	SW of Lamont	Washington, Bolivar	MS	33.53333°N 91.1°W	September 24	2:12–2:17 p.m.	4 miles (6.4 km)	100 yards (91 m)	The same parent thunderstorm that spawned the F2 in Greenville, Mississippi, also spawned a weak tornado near Lamont. It remained over open fields as it crossed from Washington to Bolivar counties.
F0	NNW of Gillett	Arkansas, Jefferson	AR	34.0°N 91.36667°W	September 24	2:19–2:32 p.m.	8.5 miles (13.7 km)	40 yards (37 m)	A tornado touched down to the south of Gillett. It moved to the northwest, mostly causing tree damage before it entered Jefferson County and lifted.
F0	W of Silver City	Humphreys	MS	33.1°N 90.51667°W	September 24	2:35–2:40 p.m.	4 miles (6.4 km)	50 yards (46 m)	A weak tornado passed west of Silver City, damaging the roof of one home along with several trees.
F1	NNW of Belzoni	Humphreys	MS	33.21667°N 90.51667°W	September 24	3:18–3:20 p.m.	1.5 miles (2.4 km)	75 yards (69 m)	A tornado struck Belzoni, causing roof damage to a home and a church. The twister also flung irrigation equipment across a field. Damage was estimated at $300,000. passed west of Silver City, damaging the roof of one home along with several trees.
F1	Isola	Humphreys, Sunflower	MS	33.26667°N 90.53333°W	September 24	3:25–3:29 p.m.	3.5 miles (5.6 km)	100 yards (91 m)	1 fatality – A tornado touched down east of Isola and moved to the north-northwest, crossing into Sunflower County. The twister destroyed a mobile home, killing a man and causing two severe injuries. Damage totaled $100,000.
F2	NNW of Belzoni	Humphreys, Sunflower	MS	33.13333°N 90.46667°W	September 24	3:34–3:58 p.m.	18 miles (29 km)	800 yards (730 m)	A long-lived tornado first touched down to the south-southeast of Belzoni. Moving to the north-northwest, the twister soon struck the city at its greatest intensity, destroying a modular commercial building and causing severe damage to several homes. The tornado wrecked windows across the city, while also causing severe damage to the Belzoni school bus barn. The tornado crossed into neighboring Sunflower County, where it damaged power lines and farm buildings. Damage across the two counties were estimated at $3.2 million, and three people sustained injuries.
F0	Shaw	Bolivar	MS	33.6°N 90.81667°W	September 24	3:35 p.m.	4 miles (6.4 km)	50 yards (46 m)	A short-lived tornado caused $30,000 worth of damage when it touched down, including a damaged shed, an uprooted tree, and a downed power line.
F0	SE of Indianola	Sunflower	MS	33.41667°N 90.61667°W	September 24	3:40–3:42 p.m.	1 mile (1.6 km)	50 yards (46 m)	A tornado touched down in an open field near Indianola before lifting up.
F2	ESE of Bevens Corner	Lonoke	AR	34.7°N 91.96667°W	September 24	3:40–3:50 p.m.	7.2 miles (11.6 km)	100 yards (91 m)	A tornado touched down near Bevens Corner and moved to the northwest. It damaged or destroyed several mobile homes, causing five injuries.
F1	NW of Sunflower	Sunflower, Bolivar	MS	33.6333°N 90.66667°W	September 24	4:02–4:15 p.m.	1 mile (1.6 km)	200 yards (180 m)	A tornado touched down northwest of Sunflower, and soon entered Bolivar County. Moving through the town of Boyle, the twister damaged mobile homes, farm equipment, and power lines. Damage was estimated at $520,000.
F0	W of Transylvania	East Carroll	LA	33.46667°N 90.33333°W	September 24	4:14–4:15 p.m.	1 mile (1.6 km)	50 yards (46 m)	A brief tornado moved across an open field to the west of Transylvania.
F1	E of Swiftown	Leflore	MS	33.3°N 90.38333°W	September 24	4:20–4:21 p.m.	1 mile (1.6 km)	100 yards (91 m)	A tornado uprooted several trees while moving across a farm, causing $40,000 in damage.
F2	SW of Dockery	Sunflower, Bolivar	MS	33.7°N 90.66667°W	September 24	4:35–4:51 p.m.	13 miles (21 km)	200 yards (180 m)	The same thunderstorm that spawned the Belzoni tornado also produced a tornado that touched down southwest of Dockery. Moving to the north-northwest, it soon entered Bolivar County, passing just east of Cleveland. While at its strongest, the twister destroyed three mobile homes, a commercial storage building, and three shed, while also severely damaging five other homes. Damage totaled $925,000. The tornado flung three bicycles 0.5 mi (0.80 km) away, before passing southwest of Merigold and lifting.
F1	W of Eudora	Chicot	AR	33.11667°N 91.28333°W	September 24	4:54–4:55 p.m.	1 mile (1.6 km)	75 yards (69 m)	A brief tornado damaged trees and power lines after touching down just west of Eudora.
F0	S of Itta Bena	Leflore	MS	33.46667°N 90.33333°W	September 24	4:56–4:59 p.m.	2 miles (3.2 km)	50 yards (46 m)	A tornado touched down south of Itta Bena and moved to the northwest, causing about $15,000 in crop damage when it uprooted a few trees.
F1	NE of Jacksonville	Lonoke, Pulaski	AR	34.9°N 92.06667°W	September 24	4:59–5:08 p.m.	5.7 miles (9.2 km)	100 yards (91 m)	A tornado passed west-southwest of Parnell. Moving to the northwest, it damaged the roofs of a few homes. The twister also knocked down trees before entering Pulaski County and lifting.
F2	NNW of Cruger	Holmes, Leflore	MS	33.35°N 90.25°W	September 24	5:00–5:12 p.m.	9 miles (14 km)	250 yards (230 m)	A tornado touched down along Mosquito Lake in Holmes County, knocking down hundreds of trees in the area. Moving to the northwest, the twister intensified as it crossed a cotton field, destroying a steel framed cotton gin and nearly destroying a seed house. Damage was heaviest between Phillipstown and Quito, including a destroyed hunting lodge, and severe damage to a church and two homes. Damage totaled $2.225 million across the two counties.
F1	NE of Macon	Pulaski, Faulkner	AR	34.96667°N 92.1°W	September 24	5:09–5:18 p.m.	8 miles (13 km)	80 yards (73 m)	A tornado touched down to the northeast of Macon and headed northwestward. It uprooted trees before entering Faulkner County and lifting.
F1	SE of Itta Bena	Leflore	MS	33.48333°N 90.31667°W	September 24	5:17–5:19 p.m.	1 mile (1.6 km)	75 yards (69 m)	The same thunderstorm that spawned the Quito tornado generated another tornado that hit Itta Bena. The twister damaged the roof of the high school, along with one home, and several trees fell along the path. Damage totaled $200,000.
F0	SW of Acona	Holmes	MS	33.23333°N 90.05°W	September 24	5:25–5:26 p.m.	1 mile (1.6 km)	75 yards (69 m)	A brief tornado downed trees and power lines, causing about $10,000 in damage, before lifting.
F1	WSW of Lake Village	Chicot	AR	33.3°N 91.38333°W	September 24	5:29–5:32 p.m.	2 miles (3.2 km)	75 yards (69 m)	A tornado left $150,000 worth of damage to trees and power lines after hitting to the west-southwest of Lake Village.
F0	SE of Holly Grove	Carroll, Leflore	MS	33.41667°N 90.16667°W	September 24	5:40–5:45 p.m.	3 miles (4.8 km)	75 yards (69 m)	A tornado moved to the northwest across wooded areas, causing $50,000 in crop damage.
F0	SW of Meadville	Franklin	MS	31.43333°N 90.93333°W	September 24	5:55–5:57 p.m.	2 miles (3.2 km)	75 yards (69 m)	A brief tornado downed a few trees, causing $15,000 in crop damage.
F2	SW of Searcy	White	AR	35.21667°N 91.81667°W	September 24	6:33–6:38 p.m.	9 miles (14 km)	150 yards (140 m)	A strong tornado touched down southwest of Searcy, or southeast of Center Hill. It moved northwestward, destroying three buildings and damaging several others, while also knocking down trees and power lines.
F2	Newton	Newton	MS	32.35°N 89.15°W	September 24	6:45–6:46 p.m.	0.8 miles (1.3 km)	100 yards (91 m)	A brief but strong tornado touched down in the northeastern portion of Newton. It struck a Lazy Boy factory destroying the roof and flinging debris 4.5 mi (7.2 km) away. The twister was strong enough to bend iron girders to an angle of 10º, and to lift a pickup truck. Trees 300 ft (91 m) from the building were cut in half. Damage was estimated at $1 million.
F0	SE of Hopewell	Cleburne	AR	35.36667°N 92.03333°W	September 24	6:55–6:56 p.m.	0.6 miles (0.97 km)	40 yards (37 m)	A brief tornado touched down to the southeast of Hopewell. It knocked over an old barn and snapped several trees.
F0	N of Monterey	Concordia	LA	31.51667°N 91.71667°W	September 24	6:56–6:57 p.m.	2 miles (3.2 km)	75 yards (69 m)	A tornado touched down near Cocodrie Lake and moved to the northeast. The twister damaged a shed and a house's awning, along with a few trees.
F1	NW of Pearson	Cleburne	AR	35.46667°N 92.16667°W	September 24	7:05–7:06 p.m.	0.6 miles (0.97 km)	40 yards (37 m)	The same thunderstorm that spawned the tornado near Hopewell generated another twister near Pearson. It damaged two mobile homes and knocked over several trees before lifting.
F1	SW of Jonesville	Catahoula	LA	31.56667°N 91.95°W	September 24	7:06–7:18 p.m.	9 miles (14 km)	50 yards (46 m)	A tornado touched down near southwest of Jonesville and tracked northeastward. The twister damaged the roofs of two homes while also knocking down trees. Damage reached $300,000.
F0	W of Anguilla	Sharkey	MS	32.96667°N 90.85°W	September 24	7:37–7:38 p.m.	1 mile (1.6 km)	100 yards (91 m)	A brief tornado snapped a few trees when it hit near Anguilla. Damage was estimated at $15,000.
F1	Nitta Yuma	Sharkey	MS	33.03333°N 90.86667°W	September 24	7:40–7:44 p.m.	3 miles (4.8 km)	100 yards (91 m)	A tornado touched down on the west side of Nitta Yuma. The twister damaged the roofs of nearly 20 homes, while also knocking down trees and power lines. One tree landed on a home. Damage was estimated at $400,000.
F1	SE of Deluce	Arkansas	AR	34.11667°N 91.15°W	September 24	10:21–10:31 p.m.	7 miles (11 km)	40 yards (37 m)	A tornado snapped or uprooted trees along its path through Arkansas County, southeast of Deluce.
F0	SE of Pace	Bolivar	MS	33.78333°N 90.85°W	September 24	11:40–11:41 p.m.	1 mile (1.6 km)	50 yards (46 m)	A brief tornado damaged the roof of one home while also snapping the limbs of a few trees. Damage was estimated at $10,000.
F0	S of Clayton	Concordia	LA	31.7°N 91.55°W	September 24	11:42–11:44 p.m.	1 mile (1.6 km)	75 yards (69 m)	A tornado hit just south of Clayton. Moving northeastward, it uprooted six trees along its path before lifting. Damage reached $3,000.
F3	Clayton	Concordia, Tensas	LA	31.71667°N 91.55°W	September 24–25	11:44 p.m.–12:04 a.m.	14 miles (23 km)	50 yards (46 m)	Another tornado touched down near Clayton. Moving to the northeast, the twister uprooted trees, including one that struck a mobile home. The tornado entered Tensas Parish and intensified to F3 intensity. There, the twister destroyed a church and two homes, flinging debris 0.5 mi (0.80 km) away, and wrapped a boat around a tree. The tornado also damaged three vehicles, one of which was flipped into a pile of downed trees. Another home had damage to its roof and windows. Damage totaled $1.1 million, and two people sustained injuries.
F0	W of Crowville	Franklin	LA	32.18333°N 91.58333°W	September 25	12:39–12:40 p.m.	0.7 miles (1.1 km)	100 yards (91 m)	A tornado damaged the roof of a school when it hit near Crowville. Damage totaled $200,000.
F0	W of Tallulah	Madison	LA	32.36667°N 91.2°W	September 25	12:43–12:49 p.m.	0.7 miles (1.1 km)	100 yards (91 m)	A weak tornado touched down south of Tallulah, and moved to the northeast across a field. It knocked down several trees and damaged a billboard. Damage reached $25,000.
F2	WSW of Fayette	Jefferson	MS	31.7°N 91.13333°W	September 25	2:17–2:28 a.m.	10 miles (16 km)	600 yards (550 m)	A large tornado touched down to the west-southwest of Fayette, and moved northeastward. It snapped or uprooted hundreds of trees along its path, while also damaging a few mobile homes. The twister removed part of the roof from a home. Damage was estimated at $480,000.
F1	WSW of Fayette	Jefferson	MS	31.76667°N 91.06667°W	September 25	2:37–2:38 a.m.	10 miles (16 km)	600 yards (550 m)	Another tornado briefly touched down near Fayette, which snapped several trees in half. Damage totaled $15,000.
F2	Red Lick	Jefferson, Claiborne	MS	31.78333°N 91.0°W	September 25	2:49–2:57 a.m.	7 miles (11 km)	800 yards (730 m)	A large tornado struck Red Lick and moved to the northeast. The twister destroyed a mobile home, injuring one person after it was flipped. The tornado also knocked down or snapped hundreds of trees. It later crossed into Claiborne before lifting. Damage was estimated at $920,000.
F0	SE of Fayette	Jefferson	MS	31.66667°N 91.0°W	September 25	3:44–3:49 a.m.	4 miles (6.4 km)	50 yards (46 m)	A tornado touched down southeast of Fayette. It damaged a mobile home while also knocking down trees and power lines. Damage was estimated at $40,000.
F0	Excel	Monroe	AL	31.4300°N 87.35°W	September 25	4:44–3:49 a.m.	2.2 miles (3.5 km)	50 yards (46 m)	A tornado hit the town of Excel, which damaged a few roofs and power lines. Damage reached $80,000.
F1	WNW of Port Gibson	Claiborne	MS	32.0°N 91.08333°W	September 25	7:02–7:03 a.m.	0.7 miles (1.1 km)	50 yards (46 m)	A brief tornado touched down near the Mississippi River to the west-northwest of Port Gibson. It damaged the roof and porch of a home while also downing several trees. Damage was estimated at $90,000.
F0	SE of Vicksburg	Warren	MS	32.28333°N 90.81667°W	September 25	8:21–8:23 a.m.	1.5 miles (2.4 km)	100 yards (91 m)	A brief tornado touched down southeast of Vickburg, which knocked down several trees and power lines. Damage reached $25,000.
F0	W of Crossville	Lamar	AL	33.73333°N 88.05°W	September 25	12:01 p.m.	0.1 miles (0.16 km)	25 yards (23 m)	A brief tornado snapped or uprooted a few trees hit west of Crossville, with $1,000 in damage.
F0	SE of Kosciusko	Attala	MS	32.98333°N 89.51667°W	September 25	12:55–12:59 p.m.	2 miles (3.2 km)	75 yards (69 m)	A brief tornado wrecked an overhang and a fence after touching down near Redwood. Damage totaled $65,000.
F0	SW of Aliceville	Pickens	AL	33.05°N 88.25°W	September 25	1:04–1:12 p.m.	5.2 miles (8.4 km)	30 yards (27 m)	A weak tornado touched down southwest of Aliceville near the Cochrane Recreation Area. It moved northeastward through mainly rural areas, cutting off the tops of trees along its path. The twister caused about $4,000 in damage.
F0	SE of Canton	Madison	MS	32.55°N 89.96667°W	September 25	1:05–1:10 p.m.	3 miles (4.8 km)	75 yards (69 m)	A tornado touched down near Natchez Trace and moved to the northeast, uprooting several trees. Damage reached $40,000.
F1	SE of Kennedy	Lamar, Fayette	AL	33.6°N 87.95°W	September 25	1:22–1:33 p.m.	3.2 miles (5.1 km)	300 yards (270 m)	A tornado hit just southeast of Kennedy and moved northeastward. It knocked down several trees, one of which fell onto a home, while also damaging a barn. The twister strengthened as it crossed into Fayette County, where it damaged three buildings before lifting. The twister caused about $140,000 in damage.
F0	SE of Raleigh	Smith	MS	32.55°N 89.96667°W	September 25	1:25–1:27 p.m.	1 mile (1.6 km)	75 yards (69 m)	A brief tornado knocked down a few trees as it moved to the east-northeast. Damage reached $25,000.
F1	SE of Starkville	Oktibbeha	MS	33.46667°N 88.83333°W	September 25	1:38–1:45 p.m.	3.5 miles (5.6 km)	75 yards (69 m)	A tornado knocked touched down in the southeastern side of Starkville, near the Mississippi State University campus. The twister severely damaged the campus's seed technology building, while also damaging roofs and windows on other buildings. The tornado moved to the northeast, damaging the roofs of several homes, before moving through University Mobile Home. There, the tornado flipped and destroyed 11 mobile homes, resulting in seven injuries. The tornado dissipated soon after. Damage totaled $2 million.
F1	Carthage	Leake	MS	32.76667°N 89.53333°W	September 25	1:47–1:50 p.m.	1.5 miles (2.4 km)	100 yards (91 m)	A tornado struck the Carthage-Leake Airport, destroying three small aircraft, with one of them flung nearly 0.25 mi (0.40 km) away. The twister also damaged a hangar at the airport. It continued to the northeast, damaging windows on one home, damaging a mobile home, and knocking down trees. Damage totaled $220,000.
F0	SE of Double Springs	Winston	AL	34.08333°N 87.33333°W	September 25	1:54–1:55 p.m.	.75 miles (1.21 km)	50 yards (46 m)	A weak tornado touched down southeast of Double Springs. The twister damaged the roof of a church, along with several power lines, with monetary damage estimated at $30,000.
F0	NW of Echola	Tuscaloosa	AL	34.08333°N 87.33333°W	September 25	1:55–1:57 p.m.	1.6 miles (2.6 km)	80 yards (73 m)	A tornado hit southeast of Echola and moved generally northward. It damaged the roofs of two houses along with several barn buildings. Damage totaled $35,000.
F1	SE of Double Springs	Winston	AL	34.08333°N 87.33333°W	September 25	1:57–2:02 p.m.	2.5 miles (4.0 km)	150 yards (140 m)	Another tornado touched down southeast of Double Springs. The twister destroyed a farm shed and flung the roof of a mobile home. It knocked down so many trees that a portion of U.S. 278 was impassable. Damage totaled $17,000.
F0	N of Hubbertville	Fayette	AL	33.81667°N 87.68333°W	September 25	2:00 p.m.	0.1 miles (0.16 km)	20 yards (18 m)	A brief tornado struck an open countryside before lifting.
F0	W of Montrose	Jasper	MS	32.13333°N 89.3°W	September 25	2:01–2:03 p.m.	1 mile (1.6 km)	75 yards (69 m)	A tornado touched down in an open field, damaging a few trees.
F0	NW of Samantha	Tuscaloosa	AL	33.5°N 87.71667°W	September 25	2:05–2:06 p.m.	0.8 miles (1.3 km)	50 yards (46 m)	The same thunderstorm that spawned the tornado in Echola also produced a brief tornado to the northwest of Samantha. The twister damaged the roofs of two homes, with a total of $17,000 in damage.
F0	SE of Delmar	Winston	AL	34.15°N 87.58333°W	September 25	2:06 p.m.	0.5 miles (0.80 km)	30 yards (27 m)	A brief tornado touched down southeast of Delmar. It downed a few power lines and snapped the top half off of trees, resulting in about $3,000 in damage.
F0	NE of Byram	Hinds	MS	32.21667°N 90.21667°W	September 25	2:28–2:30 p.m.	1 mile (1.6 km)	75 yards (69 m)	A tornado hit northeast of Byram, damaging several trees before dissipating.
F0	NE of Benevola	Pickens	AL	33.16667°N 87.88333°W	September 25	2:39 p.m.	0.3 miles (0.48 km)	25 yards (23 m)	A brief tornado struck a rural area northeast of Benevola, which damaged a few trees, resulting in $2,000 in damage.
F0	NE of Union	Greene, Tuscaloosa	AL	33.1°N 87.76667°W	September 25	2:54–2:55 p.m.	0.3 miles (0.48 km)	25 yards (23 m)	A brief tornado touched down near the Greene and Tuscaloosa county lines. The twister snapped a few trees before lifting.
F1	E of Elrod	Tuscaloosa	AL	33.25°N 87.78333°W	September 25	2:55–3:17 p.m.	13.8 miles (22.2 km)	100 yards (91 m)	The same thunderstorm that produced the tornado northeast of Union also spawned a tornado just east of Elrod. It moved to the northeast, generally following the path of the Sipsey River. Along its path, the twister knocked down or uprooted trees, resulting in $14,000 in damage.
F1	SE of Brandon	Rankin	MS	32.2°N 89.95°W	September 25	2:58–3:03 p.m.	2 miles (3.2 km)	75 yards (69 m)	A tornado touched down southeast of Brandon. It moved to the northeast and knocked down several trees, some of which fell onto homes, resulting in $400,000 in damage.
F1	S of Buhl	Tuscaloosa	AL	33.23333°N 87.76667°W	September 25	3:05–3:17 p.m.	6.7 miles (10.8 km)	150 yards (140 m)	The same thunderstorm that generated the tornado near the Greene and Tuscaloosa county lines spawned a series of tornadoes. The first one touched down just south of Buhl, the second twister in an hour to affect the community. It moved to the northeast, destroying three mobile homes and damaging four others, resulting in two injuries. The twister also knocked down trees and caused light damage to other buildings, with monetary damage estimated at $250,000. The tornado lifted near Lake Lurleen.
F0	SE of Maben	Oktibbeha	MS	33.48333°N 89.01667°W	September 25	3:14–3:16 p.m.	1 mile (1.6 km)	75 yards (69 m)	A tornado touched down southeast of Maben, which uprooted a few trees. Damage reached $20,000.
F0	NE of Buhl	Tuscaloosa	AL	33.3°N 87.71667°W	September 25	3:19–3:26 p.m.	5.8 miles (9.3 km)	100 yards (91 m)	The same thunderstorm that generated the Buhl tornado produced another tornado near Lake Lurleen, shortly after the previous one dissipated. The twister knocked down so many trees and power lines that it temporarily closed a portion of Alabama State Route 171. The tornado also damaged a few buildings, with monetary damage estimated at $20,000.
F1	N of Marion	Lauderdale	MS	32.46667°N 88.65°W	September 25	3:21–3:25 p.m.	1.8 miles (2.9 km)	150 yards (140 m)	A tornado hit north of Marion, which destroyed a farm shed and overturned a mobile home. The twister also knocked down trees, some of which fell onto homes. Damage totaled $330,000.
F0	SW of Samantha	Tuscaloosa	AL	33.35°N 87.7°W	September 25	3:24–3:31 p.m.	5 miles (8.0 km)	60 yards (55 m)	The same thunderstorm that generated a series of tornadoes near Lake Lurleen also spawned another weak twister near Lake Tuscaloosa. Moving northeast, the tornado damaged a house and knocked down several trees, causing $9,000 in damage.
F0	N of Puckett	Rankin	MS	32.16667°N 89.78333°W	September 25	4:07–4:10 p.m.	1 mile (1.6 km)	50 yards (46 m)	A tornado touched down north of Puckett, which moved to the east-northeast. It knocked down dozens of trees and damaged the roof of a storage shed. The tornado dissipated after crossing a small lake. Damage reached $35,000.
F0	WNW of Brooksville	Noxubee	MS	33.25°N 88.61667°W	September 25	4:24–4:26 p.m.	1 mile (1.6 km)	50 yards (46 m)	A brief tornado moved across an open field.
F1	SW of Clinton	Greene	AL	32.85°N 88.08333°W	September 25	2:54–2:55 p.m.	6 miles (9.7 km)	250 yards (230 m)	A tornado touched in a rural area southwest of Clinton near Trussells Creek. Moving northeastward, the twister snapped or uprooted hundreds of trees, resulting in about $250,000 in damage.
F0	S of Buhl	Tuscaloosa	AL	33.16667°N 87.76667°W	September 25	4:52–4:53 p.m.	1.2 miles (1.9 km)	60 yards (55 m)	A brief tornado touched down near Buhl to the south of the town. It moved through a rural area, damaging three homes while also knocking down trees. Damage reached $60,000.
F1	S of Buhl	Tuscaloosa	AL	33.21667°N 87.76667°W	September 25	4:59–5:06 p.m.	1.2 miles (1.9 km)	60 yards (55 m)	Another tornado touched down near Buhl, the third tornado of the day to affect the town. It moved northward into the town, damaging the roofs of several buildings including the volunteer fire department. The twister snapped trees and power lines along its path. Damage totaled $200,000.
F0	S of Coker	Tuscaloosa	AL	33.28333°N 87.7°W	September 25	5:14 p.m.	0.1 miles (0.16 km)	10 yards (9.1 m)	A brief waterspout touched down on Lake Lurleen from the same thunderstorm that produced the last twister in Buhl. The waterspout moved onshore into a rural area, becoming an F0 tornado before lifting.
F0	S of Coatopa	Sumter	AL	32.48333°N 88.06667°W	September 25	8:42–8:46 p.m.	2.8 miles (4.5 km)	50 yards (46 m)	A weak tornado struck Coatopa, and moved to the northeast. It knocked down several trees, some of which fell onto vehicles and a trailer. The twister also damaged the roofs of two barns. Damage totaled $22,000.
F0	Monroe County Airport	Monroe	AL	31.46667°N 87.35°W	September 26	4:17–4:20 a.m.	2 miles (3.2 km)	100 yards (91 m)	A tornado struck the Monroe County Airport, damaging hangars and wind equipment there. The twister also knocked down power lines and trees, with a total of $200,000 in damage.

== See also ==
- List of tornadoes spawned by tropical cyclones
  - Hurricane Katrina tornado outbreak
  - Hurricane Ivan tornado outbreak
