= Kimbrell =

Kimbrell may refer to:

- Kimbrell (surname)
- Kimbrell, Alabama, an unincorporated community in the U.S.
- Kimbrell, Kentucky, an unincorporated community in the U.S.
