= First ladies and gentlemen of Alabama =

List of spouses of Alabama governors

First Lady/Gentleman of Alabama
- Current; Vacant since April 10, 2017
- Style: First Lady; First Gentleman
- Residence: Alabama Governor's Mansion
- Inaugural holder: Mary Holman Freeman Bibb
- Formation: 1817

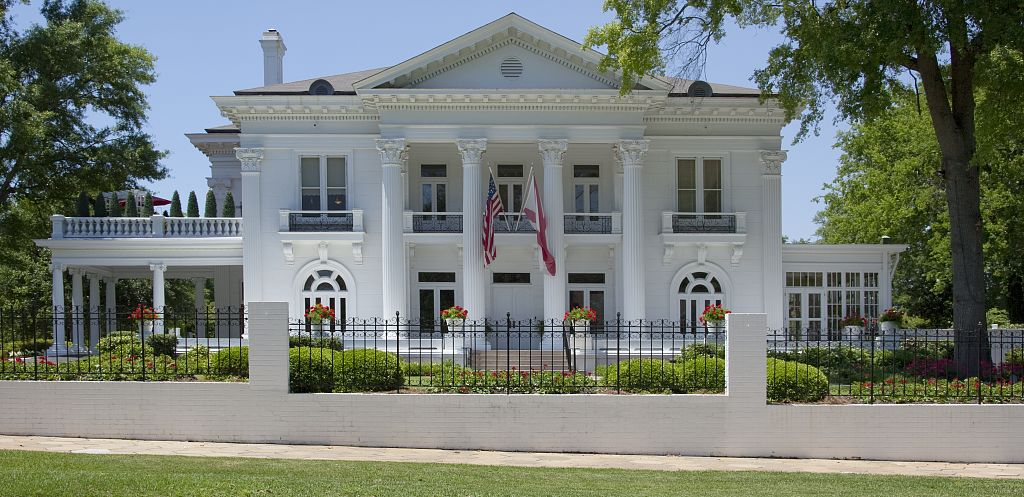
The Alabama Governor's Mansion

First Lady or First Gentleman of Alabama is the honorary title given to the spouse of the Governor of Alabama. They are the official host of the Alabama Governor's Mansion in Montgomery, Alabama. As of 2024, Alabama has had 54 governors. Two have been women. Seven were widowed or unmarried and could appoint a relative as official state hostess. Felicia Steptoe Pickett remains the youngest first lady in Alabama history. She may have been 16 when she married governor Reuben Chapman who was 39 although discrepancies in that chronology have been noted. Patsy Riley wrote a book about 11 of the state's first ladies.

== List ==
Name	Image	Years	Relation to Governor of Alabama	Notes	Ref
Mary Holman Freeman Bibb		1817-1820	wife of William Wyatt Bibb		
Parmelia Thompson		1820-1821	wife of Thomas Bibb		
Martha Lenoir		1821-1825	wife of Israel Pickens		
n/a		1825-1829	John Murphy		
Mary Parham Caller		1829-1831	wife of Gabriel Moore		
n/a		1831	Samuel B. Moore		
Sarah Ann Haynsworth Gayle		1831-1835	wife of John Gayle		
Felicia Steptoe Pickett (1819–1870)		1847-1849	wife of Reuben Chapman		
Georgena Jones		1890-1894	wife of Thomas G. Jones		
Elizabeth Kirkman O'Neal		1911–1915	wife of Emmet O'Neal		
Laura Montgomery Henderson		1915-1919	wife of Charles Henderson		
Mary Elizabeth Clark Kilby		1919-1923	wife of Thomas Kilby		
Elizabeth "Lizzie" Andrews Nabors		1923-1927	wife of William W. Brandon		
Dixie Bibb Graves		1927–1931	wife of Bibb Graves	Later became the first female U.S. senator from Alabama	
Margaret Otis Duggan Miller		1931-1935	wife of Benjamin M. Miller		
Dixie Bibb Graves		1935-1939	wife of Bibb Graves		
Juliet Dixon		1939-1943	wife of Frank M. Dixon		
Runy Ellis			sister of Jim Folsom		
Jamelle Folsom		1947-1951	wife of Jim Folsom		
Alice Persons		1951-1955	wife of Gordon Persons		
Jamelle Folsom		1955-1959	wife of Jim Folsom		
Mary Jo Patterson		1959-1963	wife of John Patterson		
Lurleen Wallace		1963-1967	wife of George Wallace		
George Wallace		1967-1968	husband of Lurleen Wallace	First Gentleman	
Martha Farmer Brewer		1968-1971	Albert Brewer		
Cornelia Wallace		1971-1979	wife of George Wallace		
Bobbie Mae Mooney James		1979–1983	wife of Fob James		
Lisa T. Wallace			wife of George Wallace		
Helen Hunt (née Chambers)		1987-1993	wife of H. Guy Hunt		
Bobbie Mae Mooney James		1995–1999	wife of Fob James		
Lori Allen Siegelman		1999-2003	wife of Don Siegelman		
Patsy Riley		2003-2011	wife of Bob Riley		
Dianne Bentley		2011-2017	wife of Robert J. Bentley		
n/a		2017-2027	Kay Ivey		
Suzanne Tuberville		2027–present	wife of Tommy Tuberville		
