= Senator Kimbrell =

Senator Kimbrell may refer to:

- Fuller Kimbrell (1909–2013), Alabama State Senate
- Josh Kimbrell (born 1984), South Carolina State Senate
