= Glen Allen, Alabama =

- Town
- Seal

- Location in Fayette and Marion counties, Alabama
- Coordinates: 33°52′30″N 87°44′25″W
- Country: United States
- State: Alabama
- Counties: Fayette, Marion

Area
  - Total: 6.54 sq mi (16.9 km^{2})
  - Land: 6.53 sq mi (16.9 km^{2})
  - Water: 0.01 sq mi (0.026 km^{2})
- Elevation: 574 ft (175 m)

Population (2020)
  - Total: 433
  - Density: 66.34/sq mi (25.61/km^{2})
- Time zone: UTC-6 (Central (CST))
  - Summer (DST): UTC-5 (CDT)
- ZIP code: 35559
- Area codes: 205, 659
- FIPS code: 01-29944
- GNIS feature ID: 2406574
- Website: townofglenallen.org

Glen Allen is a town located in Fayette and Marion counties in the U.S. state of Alabama. The town incorporated in May 1959. At the 2020 census, the population was 433, down from 510 at the 2010 census. Glen Allen is positioned along the BNSF railway and is near Interstate 22, providing access to multiple expanding industries.

== Geography ==
Glen Allen is located on the border of Fayette and Marion counties. It is bordered to the west by the city of Winfield. Interstate 22 passes 5 miles (8 km) north of the town, with access from Exit 34.

According to the U.S. Census Bureau, the town has a total area of 6.5 square kilometres (2.5 sq mi), of which 0.01 square miles (0.03 km^{2}), or 0.21%, are water.

== Demographics ==
Historical population
Census	Pop.	Note	%±
1960	131		—
1970	276		110.7%
1980	312		13.0%
1990	350		12.2%
2000	442		26.3%
2010	510		15.4%
2020	433		−15.1%
U.S. Decennial Census; 2013 Estimate

As of the census of 2010 there were 510 people, 377 households, and 327 families residing in the town. The population density was 82.2 inhabitants per square mile (31.7/km^{2}). There were 215 housing units at an average density of 40.0 per square mile (15.4/km^{2}). The racial makeup of the town was 83.03% White, 15.61% Black or African American, 0.68% Asian, 0.45% from other races, and 0.23% from two or more races. 1.36% of the population were Hispanic or Latino of any race.

There were 377 households, out of which 32.2% had children under the age of 18 living with them, 62.1% were married couples living together, 5.6% had a female householder with no husband present, and 27.7% were non-families. 27.1% of all households were made up of individuals, and 14.1% had someone living alone who was 65 years of age or older. The average household size was 2.50 and the average family size was 2.99.

In the town, the population was spread out, with 24.2% under the age of 18, 10.0% from 18 to 24, 27.1% from 25 to 44, 27.8% from 45 to 64, and 10.9% who were 65 years of age or older. The median age was 37 years. For every 100 females, there were 91.3 males. For every 100 females age 18 and over, there were 89.3 males.

The median income for a household in the town was $26,827, and the median income for a family was $36,875. Males had a median income of $24,531 versus $19,063 for females. The per capita income for the town was $17,877. About 12.6% of families and 19.3% of the population were below the poverty line, including 21.5% of those under age 18 and 11.3% of those age 65 or over.

== Education ==
Hubbertville School, a PK-12 unit school, is located in the southern portion of the town.

== Governance ==
The town is governed by a mayor and city council. The corporate limits of Glen Allen include the communities of Hubbertville and Bazemore.
