= Scott Dill =

American football player (born 1966)

No. 74, 76
- Positions: Tackle, guard

Personal information
- Born: April 5, 1966 (age 60); Birmingham, Alabama, U.S.
- Listed height: 6 ft 5 in (1.96 m)
- Listed weight: 294 lb (133 kg)

Career information
- High school: Berry (Berry, Alabama)
- College: Memphis
- NFL draft: 1988: 9th round, 233rd overall pick

Career history
- Phoenix Cardinals (1988–1989); Tampa Bay Buccaneers (1990–1995); Minnesota Vikings (1996–1997)

Career NFL statistics
- Games played: 110
- Games started: 52
- Fumble recoveries: 2
- Stats at Pro Football Reference

Gerald Scott Dill (born April 5, 1966) is an American former professional football player who was an offensive tackle for 10 seasons in the National Football League (NFL). He played for the Phoenix Cardinals (1988–1989), Tampa Bay Buccaneers (1990–1995), and Minnesota Vikings (1996–1997). He played college football for the Memphis Tigers and was selected by the Cardinals in the ninth round of the 1988 NFL draft. He retired because of a back injury.
