= Albert Brewer =

American politician (1928–2017)

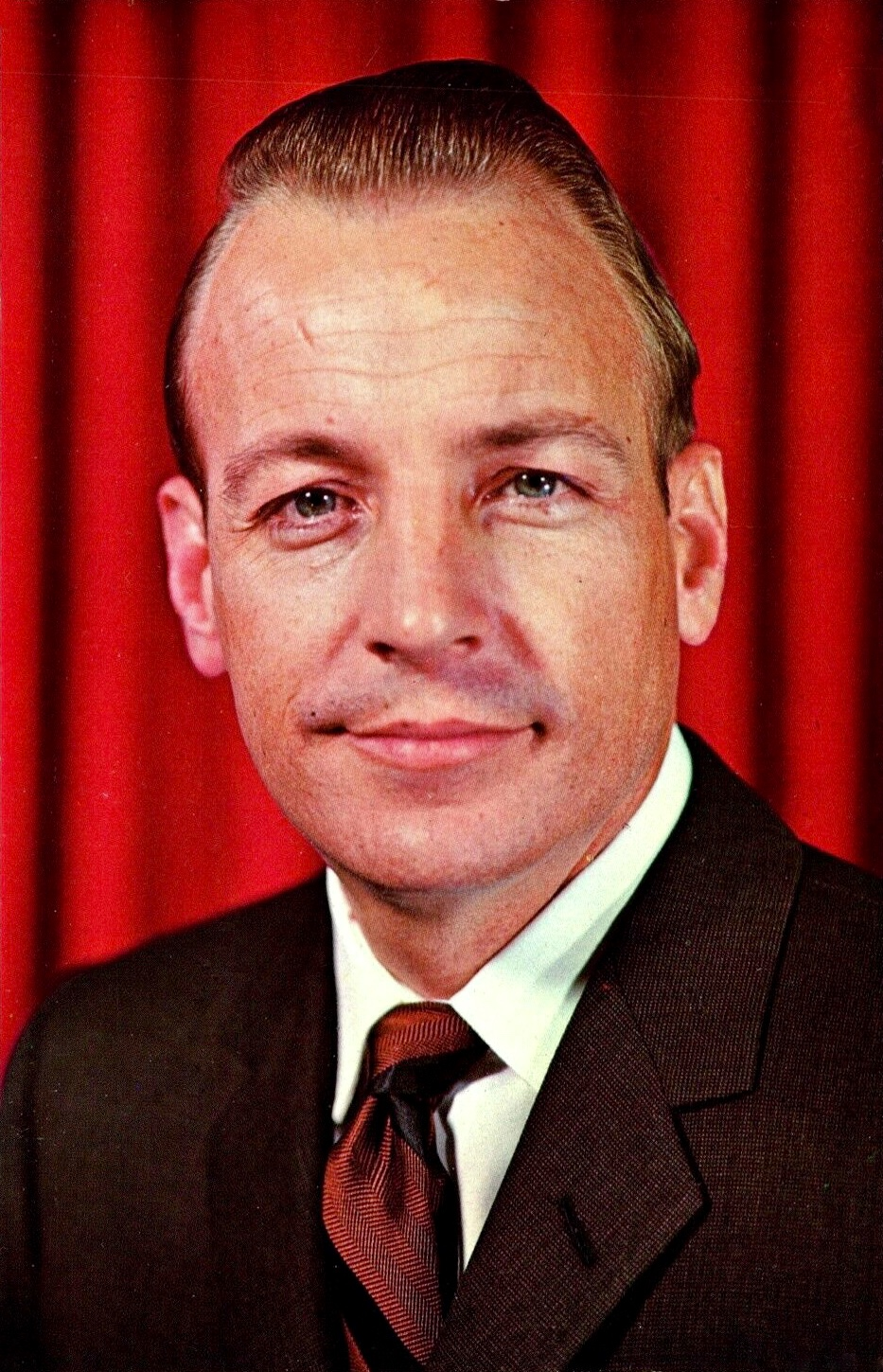
- Official portrait, 1967

47th Governor of Alabama
- In office May 7, 1968 – January 18, 1971
- Lieutenant: Vacant
- Preceded by: Lurleen Wallace
- Succeeded by: George Wallace

21st Lieutenant Governor of Alabama
- In office January 16, 1967 – May 7, 1968
- Governor: Lurleen Wallace
- Preceded by: James Allen
- Succeeded by: Jere Beasley

58th Speaker of the Alabama House of Representatives
- In office January 1963 – January 1967
- Preceded by: Virgis M. Ashworth
- Succeeded by: Rankin Fite

Member of the Alabama House of Representatives from Morgan County, Seat 1
- In office January 1955 – January 1967
- Preceded by: Noble Russell
- Succeeded by: Leslie Doss

Personal details
- Born: Albert Preston Brewer; October 26, 1928 Bethel Springs, Tennessee, U.S.
- Died: January 2, 2017 (aged 88) Birmingham, Alabama, U.S.
- Resting place: Southern Heritage Cemetery, Pelham, Alabama
- Party: Democratic
- Spouse: Martha Farmer (m. 1950; died 2006)
- Children: 2
- Education: University of Alabama (BA, LLB)
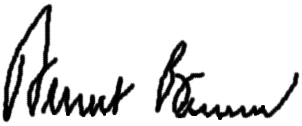
- Signature

Albert Preston Brewer (October 26, 1928 – January 2, 2017) was an American lawyer and Democratic Party politician who served as the 47th governor of Alabama from 1968 to 1971. He previously served as the lieutenant governor of Alabama, the speaker of the Alabama House of Representatives, and as an Alabama state representative representing Morgan County from 1955 to 1967.

== Early life ==
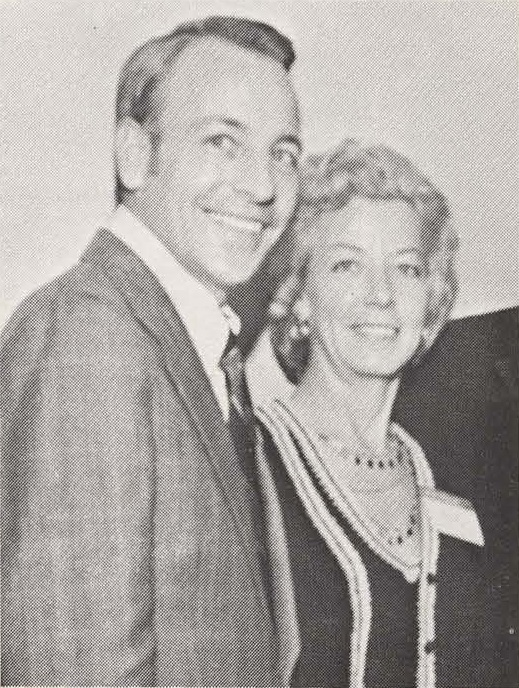
Brewer with his wife, Martha Farmer

Albert Preston Brewer was born on October 26, 1928, in Bethel Springs, Tennessee, United States, to Daniel A. Brewer, a farmer, and Clara Albert Brewer. While Albert was a child, the family moved to Decatur so his father could take a job with the Tennessee Valley Authority. Brewer stayed there and attended Lafayette Street School, Decatur Jr. High School, and Decatur High School, until he left for the University of Alabama in 1946 to study history and political science. He earned his law degree from the University of Alabama School of Law in 1952 and returned to Decatur to practice law. From 1956 to 1963 he served as Chairman of the Decatur Planning Commission, and in 1963 he was selected as Decatur's “Outstanding Young Man of the Year” and was selected by the Alabama Junior Chamber of Commerce as one of the four “Outstanding Young Men in Alabama.”

Brewer married Martha Helen Farmer in 1950 and had two children, Rebecca Anne and Beverly Allison. He was a Baptist.

== Legislative career ==
=== House of Representatives ===
In 1953, Brewer chaired the "Young Democrats" chapter for Alabama's 8th congressional district. In 1954, the incumbent legislator serving Morgan County in the Alabama House of Representatives announced his retirement. Local community leaders recruited Brewer to run. He won the Democratic primary and, facing no opposition in the general election, was seated the following year. He was reelected in 1958 and 1962.

With the support of Governor-elect George Wallace, he was elected State House speaker at the opening of the 1963 legislative session on January 8 without opposition. The speakership also made him ex officio chairman of the House Rules Committee. Under Brewer's leadership, the House was generally supportive of Wallace's goals. During the session, a bill to increase education spending, coupled with new tax increases, was introduced and passed through the legislature. Brewer, wary of Wallace's campaign promises to block tax increases, met with the governor to ask when he would veto the bill and send it back to the legislature. Wallace stated that he did not intend to veto the bill to preserve his campaign pledge, instead saying that he would "just yell nigger" to avoid scrutiny. After this, Brewer began to have doubts about Wallace's merits.

In 1964, Brewer and the future U.S. Senator James B. Allen, then the lieutenant governor, were among the unpledged presidential electors on the Alabama ballot. They lost to the Republican slate committed to Barry Goldwater. No electors pledged to President Lyndon B. Johnson were permitted on the Alabama ballot. While national Democrats balked over Johnson's exclusion, most supported the unpledged slate, which competed directly with the Republican electors. As The Tuscaloosa News explained, loyalist electors would have offered a clearer choice to voters than did the unpledged slate.

=== Lieutenant governor ===
In 1966 Brewer considered running for the office of governor, as incumbent governor George Wallace was constitutionally restricted from seeking another term. The governor's wife, Lurleen Wallace, entered the race and Brewer, convinced a gubernatorial candidacy would be futile, decided to run for the office of lieutenant governor. With a coalition of Wallace supporters, organized labor, and urbanites, he overwhelmingly defeated his opponent in the Democratic primary and faced no opposition in the general election. He was sworn in on January 16, 1967. Lurleen Wallace also won and was inaugurated that month. As lieutenant governor, he convinced the legislature to create an Education Study Commission.

In early July 1967 Lurleen Wallace traveled to Texas for cancer treatment. State law stipulated that if the governor was out of state for 21 days, the lieutenant governor officially assumed their responsibilities as acting governor. This went into effect at the beginning of July 24, and Brewer served as acting governor for about 15 hours, meeting with some state officials, signing extradition papers, and appointing 25 honorary colonels, before Wallace was flown back to Alabama.

== Governor ==
=== Executive action ===
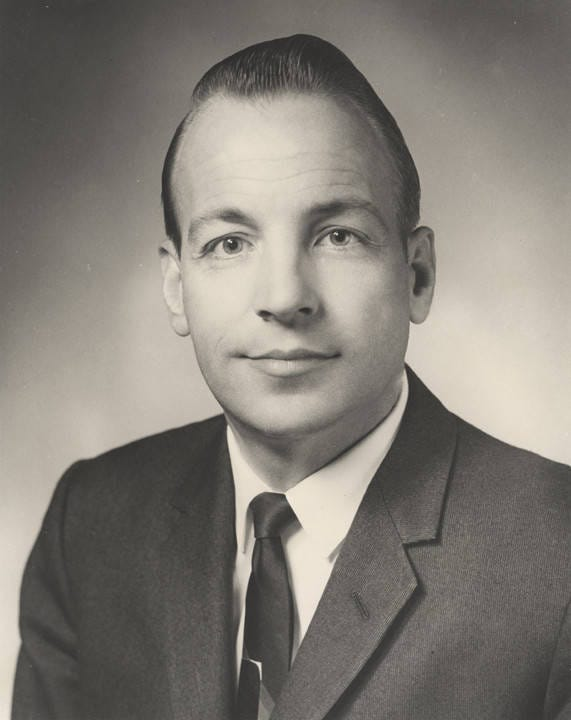
Official portrait as governor, 1971

Though aware of Lurleen Wallace's affliction with cancer, Brewer was not familiar with the severity of her condition until shortly before she died. Wallace succumbed on May 7, 1968, and, as stipulated in the constitution, Brewer succeeded to the office of governor. Taking the oath before only his family and George Wallace, Brewer remained very guarded about his feelings and views early in his new tenure, and delayed moving into the governor's mansion until Wallace had found a new home for his family. Wallace's erstwhile legal counsel, Cecil Jackson, directed all executive cabinet members to offer their resignations to Brewer to allow him to build a team of his choosing. Brewer ended up retaining most of the cabinet, though he fired the public safety director and the director of the Department of Conservation after they refused to offer their resignations (and after the latter became involved in a physical altercation with another state employee).

Fairly soon after taking office, Brewer and his new state finance director, Bob Ingram, uncovered the large extent to which the Wallace administration had favored supporters in conducting state business, including alleged kickbacks for road construction contracts and asking state troopers to funnel stranded motorists to preferred tow truck services. Brewer was personally bothered by these improprieties but, wanting to seek election to his own gubernatorial term in 1970, felt it would be unwise to anger Wallace supporters by publicly exposing and denouncing these practices. As part of their attempt to quietly reform the executive branch, Brewer and Ingram tapped experienced public servants who they viewed as ethical, such as Tom Brassell, who was made assistant finance director. Despite this commitment to reform, he sometimes intervened in hiring and other state business to assist friends and dole out favors. On the whole, politicization in Brewer's administration was more muted than his predecessors', and civil servant morale improved during his tenure.

Unlike his two predecessors, Brewer held weekly press conferences. At one such meeting in June 1968, Brewer called for the establishment of a state motor pool, saying he would create one by executive order and then ask for the legislature to affirm it. The motor pool system, which he hoped would limit inappropriate use of state vehicles for personal purposes, required all vehicles to be checked out and all fuel to be purchased from the state. He also had state insignia prominently affixed to all motor pool vehicles to increase their visibility as government property. All vehicles deemed unnecessary—totaling about 1,000—were requisitioned from various agencies and listed for sale, including the governor's limousine. In the end, the reforms only generated minor cost savings for the government. He also had excess copy machines sold, consolidated the state's computer systems, eliminated 12 senior assistant positions, and dispatched various staff the Wallaces' had loaned to the governor's office back to their agencies of origin to handle their official competencies.

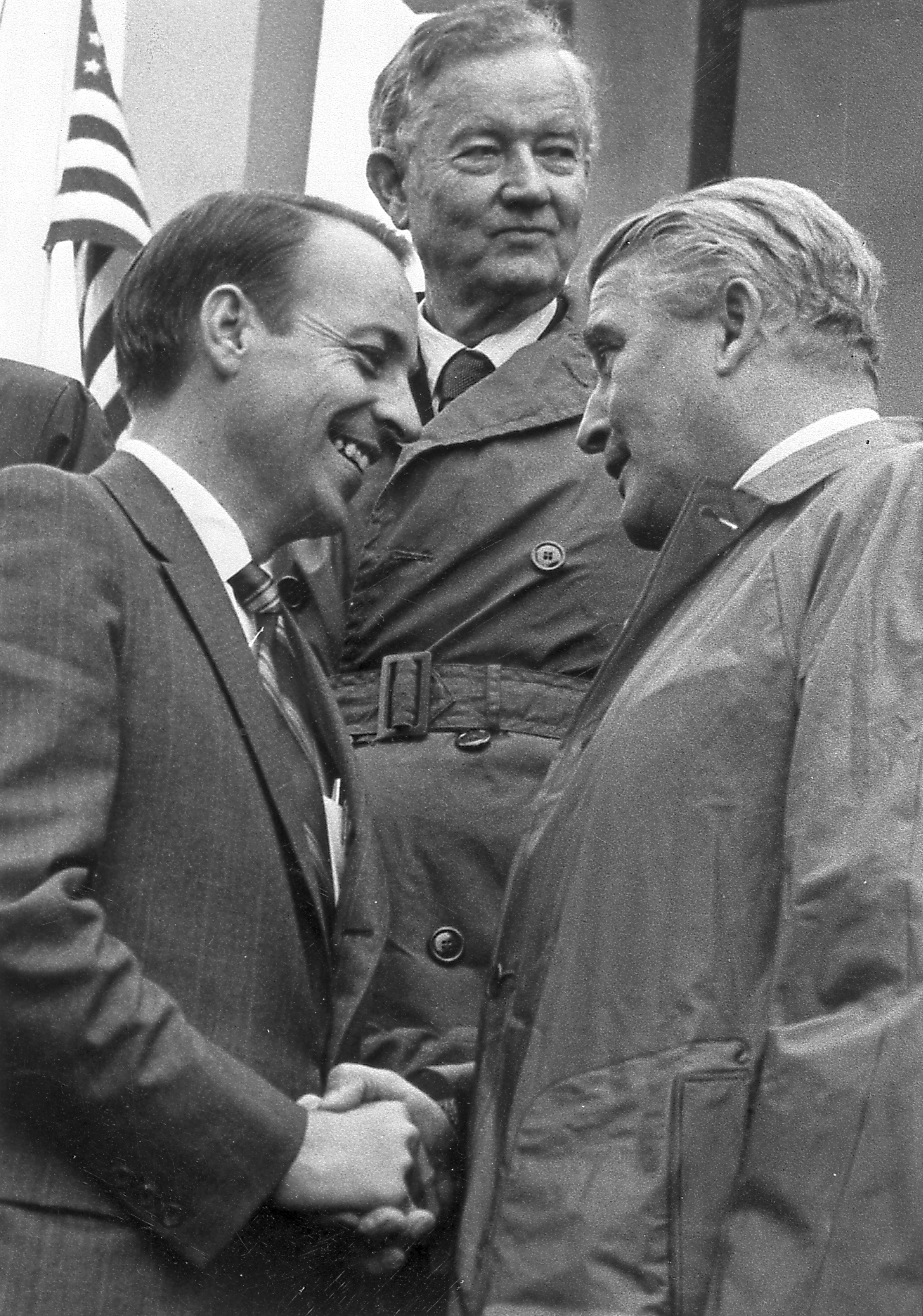
Brewer (left) greets Dr. Wernher von Braun; Alabama Senator John Sparkman is at center

George Wallace was critical of some of the reforms, particularly the motor pool, complaining that they reflected a de facto rebuke of his late wife. While originally cautious about besmirching the Wallaces, the complaints annoyed Brewer and led him to abandon his earlier concerns. The governor also initiated an investigation into commissions collections by agents of the Alcohol Beverage Control Board. While the practice had been de jure eliminated by law in 1963 supported by both Wallace and Brewer, many board agents were purportedly collecting commissions on distillery sales without authorization during the Wallaces' tenures. George Wallace denied any knowledge of the impropriety and Brewer affirmed his innocence, but Wallace still criticized Brewer for the publicity the scandal received.

Brewer also took actions in accordance with his own socially conservative views which were popular among most Alabamians. After being informed by his wife that pornographic movies were being displayed in Bessemer, he authorized a series of state raids on theatres. He also initiated crackdowns on alcohol and narcotics abuse. Following a series of influence peddling scandals in the legislature, Brewer issued an executive order creating an ethics commission tasked with drafting a code of ethics for potential adoption by the legislature. Among his suggested points were the prohibition of gifts for officials, a ban on officials working for and receiving compensation from entities they regulated, and establishing conflict of interest disclosure rules. He offered funds from his office budget to support the commission's work.

To promote economic development, Brewer pursued industrial recruitment, traveling to New York to speak with corporate executives and hosting various in-person meetings with company representatives. He created the Alabama Program Development Office to link federal grant applications with local government's development efforts. Following a series of major fish kills on state rivers caused by dumping of chemicals, Brewer encouraged the state to take action against Geigy Chemical Company and create new anti-pollution laws.

=== Legislative action ===
In legislative and policy disputes, Brewer preferred negotiation and finding common ground rather than public spats or power plays with patronage, as George Wallace had. In anticipation of the first legislative session being convened while he was governor, he decided to focus on improving education, consolidating bureaucratic procedures, trimming unnecessary spending, and improving Alabama's national image. He investigated the state of education in Alabama, and found that overall the system was not improving relative to other states, despite efforts at reform during the Wallace administrations. He informed state education officials that he wanted to alter the state's strategy for responding to federal school desegregation orders; in contrast to Wallace's flagrant hostility and refusals, Brewer would "try to do it in a way that will let us do the most palatable thing for the people, the patrons of our system."

Brewer believed that a school choice policy which permitted integrated schooling options could satisfy the federal government's demands and be accepted by most Alabamians, thus preserving popular support for his goal of improving the public education system. Many school choice proponents in the South had advocated for choice policies to deliberately stall integration and preserve segregated schools, and by that point many federal courts were dissatisfied with such proposals. Several weeks after Brewer communicated to President Lyndon B. Johnson that he would engage the federal government in good faith on school segregation issues, the United States Attorney General sued in the United States District Court for the Middle District of Alabama to replace school choice options. After the court ordered new measures be taken to further integration, Johnson ordered the schools integrate their faculty at a specific ratio and directed that some black schools be closed. The governor responded by engaging in similar rhetoric as segregationists, complaining of bureaucratic interference and social engineering. He also warned that under a more directed desegregation plan, most white parents would simply enroll their children in private schools. Despite this, he pledged to respect any court orders on racial matters. His request that Johnson reconsider his order was rejected.

Meanwhile, the Education Study Commission released a report on education in Alabama which outlined numerous deficiencies including overcrowded schools, inadequate instructional materials, underqualified educators, and uncompetitive pay rates for teachers. The commission recommended that additional funding was needed to improve the situation. In 1969 he called the legislature into special session to consider 30 bills aimed at improving education. Despite resistance from some urban legislators who thought the package did more to improve rural areas, the proposals were passed, increasing education spending by $132 million, raising teacher salaries by over 20 percent over two years, making the state and local superintendent positions appointive, granting the Education Study Commission statutory status, and creating the Alabama Commission on Higher Education.

At the beginning of the 1969 session, Brewer announced that he would push for new pollution control laws. With industrial groups heavily lobbying the legislature, only a weak bill was passed. More focused on education reform, Brewer decided against pushing for stronger regulations in a matter which would anger corporate interests and, in his view, earn him few additional votes in the 1970 election. More fish kills and serious mercury pollution in 1970 led for Brewer to appeal for federal assistance a commission a water quality survey and, as a lame duck, he briefly considered convening a special session to address inadequate pollution controls before ruling it unfeasible. His efforts during the 1969 session to strengthen consumer credit protections or schedule the legislature for annual sessions (instead of biannual) also failed. Despite this, Brewer's administration was able to obtain funding for a state Medicaid program, a state employee pay hike, new highway safety legislation, two anti-pornography measures, a meat inspection law, and a requirement that all workers contracted by the state for construction be guaranteed standard wages.

=== 1970 gubernatorial campaign ===
County results of the 1970 Alabama Democratic gubernatorial primary Wallace: 50-60% 60-70% 70-80% Brewer: 50-60% 60-70% 70-80%

Brewer supported Wallace's 1968 presidential campaign, soliciting donations and delivering speeches on his behalf. Within months of Brewer assuming office, Wallace assured him privately and stated publicly that he would not seek the governor's office in 1970. Around the Thanksgiving holiday in 1968, Wallace confronted Brewer about the alcohol agents scandal, and told Brewer in a meeting at the governor's mansion, "If you keep talking about it, it's going to reflect on me and I may just have to run against you in 1970." Brewer countered, "[Y]ou never have had a better friend than I've been to you and [your wife], and you told me [so] yourself when she died." The two spoke infrequently after the meeting, and Brewer continued with his preparations to be elected as governor in his own right in 1970, and, mindful of the possibility of another Wallace candidacy, took increasingly bolder policy positions and actions.

In that effort, he gained an important ally in U.S. president Richard Nixon, who had defeated Wallace in the 1968 presidential election and sought to neutralize Wallace as a potential adversary in 1972. Brewer's 1970 gubernatorial campaign, however, was revolutionary in many respects. Although earlier in his political career he was regarded as a segregationist but not a race-baiter, Brewer refused to engage in racist rhetoric and courted newly registered black voters. He hoped to build a coalition of black people, educated middle-class whites, and working-class whites from northern Alabama, traditionally a more liberal part of the state. He unveiled a platform calling for more funding for education, an ethics commission and a commission to revise Alabama's 1901 state constitution, which had been deliberately framed to disenfranchise black people and poor whites.

Brewer led Wallace in the Democratic primary but failed to win an outright majority. He then faced Wallace in a runoff. Wallace, whose presidential ambitions would have been destroyed with a defeat, ran a very aggressive and dirty campaign using racist rhetoric while proposing few ideas of his own. The Wallace campaign aired TV ads with slogans such as "Do you want the black block electing your governor?" and circulated an ad showing a white girl surrounded by seven black boys, with the slogan "Wake Up Alabama! Blacks vow to take over Alabama." Wallace called Brewer a sissy and promised not to run for president a third time. Wallace narrowly won the Democratic runoff with 51.6 percent of the vote to Brewer's 48.4% and won the general election by a wide margin. He was succeeded by Wallace on January 18, 1971, after 987 days in office.

== Later life ==
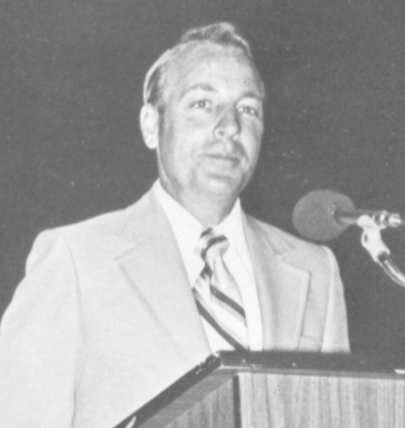
Brewer speaking at Montevallo High School in 1976

After leaving office in January 1971, Brewer joined a law firm in Montgomery. He considered challenging Wallace again in the 1974 gubernatorial election, hoping that the salience of racial politics would decline by that point, but decided against it as Wallace's popularity persisted unabated after the 1972 assassination attempt on Wallace by Arthur Bremer. Instead, Brewer ran for governor again in 1978, but lost the Democratic primary, missing the runoff by almost 2 percentage points. When Wallace ran again in 1982, Brewer endorsed Republican Emory Folmar in the general election. In 1987 he became a professor of law and government at Samford University's Cumberland School of Law. Before his death, he taught a course on Professional Responsibility at the Cumberland School of Law. He was also an active leader with the Alabama Citizens for Constitutional Reform since 2000.

On January 2, 2017, Brewer died in Jackson Hospital, Montgomery, Alabama, at 88.

== Legacy ==
Albert P. Brewer High School in eastern Morgan County is named in honor of Brewer. The school opened in 1972.

Historian Gordon E. Harvey wrote, "Brewer did more to improve education in Alabama than most of his predecessors and all but a few of his successors."

== Electoral history ==
1954 Alabama House of Representatives, Morgan County Seat 1 Democratic primary
Party	Candidate	Votes	%
Democratic	Albert Brewer	7,924	63.7%
Democratic	Joe S. Elliott	4,523	36.3%
Total votes		12,447	100.00%

1954 Alabama House of Representatives, Morgan County Seat 1
Party	Candidate	Votes	%
Democratic	Albert Brewer	6,109	100.0%
Total votes		6,109	100.00%

1958 Alabama House of Representatives, Morgan County Seat 1
Party	Candidate	Votes	%
Democratic	Albert Brewer	4,954	100.0%
Total votes		4,954	100.00%

1962 Alabama House of Representatives, Morgan County Seat 1
Party	Candidate	Votes	%
Democratic	Albert Brewer	7,514	100.0%
Total votes		7,514	100.00%

1966 Alabama lieutenant gubernatorial Democratic primary
Party	Candidate	Votes	%
Democratic	Albert Brewer	473,617	66.9%
Democratic	Neil Metcalf	125,047	17.7%
Democratic	John Tyson Sr.	66,302	9.4%
Democratic	John A. Reynolds	43,332	6.1%
Total votes		708,298	100.0

1966 Alabama lieutenant gubernatorial election
Party	Candidate	Votes	%
Democratic	Albert Brewer	364,473	100.0%
Total votes		364,473	100.00%

1970 Alabama gubernatorial Democratic primary
Party	Candidate	Votes	%
Democratic	Albert Brewer	428,146	42.0%
Democratic	George Wallace	416,443	40.8%
Democratic	Charles Woods	149,987	14.7%
Democratic	Asa Carter	15,441	1.5%
Democratic	Jim Folsom	4,123	0.4%
Democratic	Coleman Brown	2,836	0.3%
Democratic	Ralph Price	2,804	0.3%
Total votes		1,019,780	100.0%

1970 Alabama gubernatorial Democratic primary runoff
Party	Candidate	Votes	%
Democratic	George Wallace	559,832	51.6%
Democratic	Albert Brewer	525,951	48.4%
Total votes		1,085,823	100.0%

1978 Alabama gubernatorial Democratic primary
Party	Candidate	Votes	%
Democratic	Fob James	256,196	28.5%
Democratic	Bill Baxley	210,089	23.4%
Democratic	Albert Brewer	193,479	21.5%
Democratic	Sid McDonald	143,930	16.0%
Democratic	Jere Beasley	77,202	8.6%
Democratic	K.C. Foster	4,948	0.6%
Democratic	Horace Howell	4,730	0.5%
Democratic	Jim Folsom	4,632	0.5%
Democratic	Bob Muncaster	1,776	0.2%
Democratic	Ralph Price	1,396	0.2%
Democratic	Charles Woods	700	0.1%
Democratic	Fred Sandefer	622	0.1%
Democratic	Cornelia Wallace	217	0.0%
Total votes		899,917	100.0%

== Works cited ==
- Frederick, Jeff (2007). Stand Up for Alabama: Governor George Wallace. Tuscaloosa: University of Alabama Press. ISBN 9780817315740.
- Harvey, Gordon E. (2002). A Question of Justice: New South Governors and Education, 1968-1976. Tuscaloosa: The University of Alabama Press. ISBN 9780817311575.
- Rogers, William Warren, ed. (1994). Alabama: The History of a Deep South State. Tuscaloosa: University of Alabama Press. ISBN 9780817307141.

Party political offices
Preceded by James Allen	Democratic nominee for Lieutenant Governor of Alabama; 1966	Succeeded by Jere Beasley
Political offices
Preceded by James Allen	Lieutenant Governor of Alabama; 1967–1968	Succeeded by Jere Beasley
Preceded by Lurleen Wallace	Governor of Alabama; 1968–1971	Succeeded by George Wallace
