= Kimbrell (surname) =

Kimbrell is the surname of the following people:

- Anna Kimbrell (born 1990), American baseball player
- Bettye Kimbrell (born 1936), American master folk artist for quilting
- Fuller Kimbrell (1909–2013), American politician from Alabama
- James Kimbrell (born 1967), American poet
- Josh Kimbrell (born 1984), American politician from South Carolina
- Marketa Kimbrell (1928–2011), Czechoslovak-American actress and acting teacher
- Shawna Rochelle Kimbrell (born 1976), United States Air Force pilot

== See also ==
- Craig Kimbrel, Major League Baseball pitcher
