= Bazemore, Alabama =

Unincorporated community in Alabama, United States

- Unincorporated community
- Location in Alabama
- Coordinates: 33°53′40″N 87°42′00″W
- Country: United States
- State: Alabama
- County: Fayette
- Elevation: 459 ft (140 m)
- Time zone: UTC-6 (Central (CST))
  - Summer (DST): UTC-5 (CDT)
- Area codes: 205, 659
- GNIS feature ID: 113618

Bazemore is a small community located in northern Fayette County, Alabama, United States, near the Marion and Walker County lines, approximately three miles south of I-22. The community is situated at the head of the Sipsey River where New River and Little New River converge. The BNSF rail system runs through the heart of the community.

Prior to desegregation, the community was home to Piney Grove School. Two churches are located in Bazemore; Piney Grove Church of Christ and White's Chapel Church of Christ.

The community has been annexed by the nearby town of Glen Allen and is subject to municipal governance of the town.
