= Dixie Bibb Graves =

American politician (1882–1965)

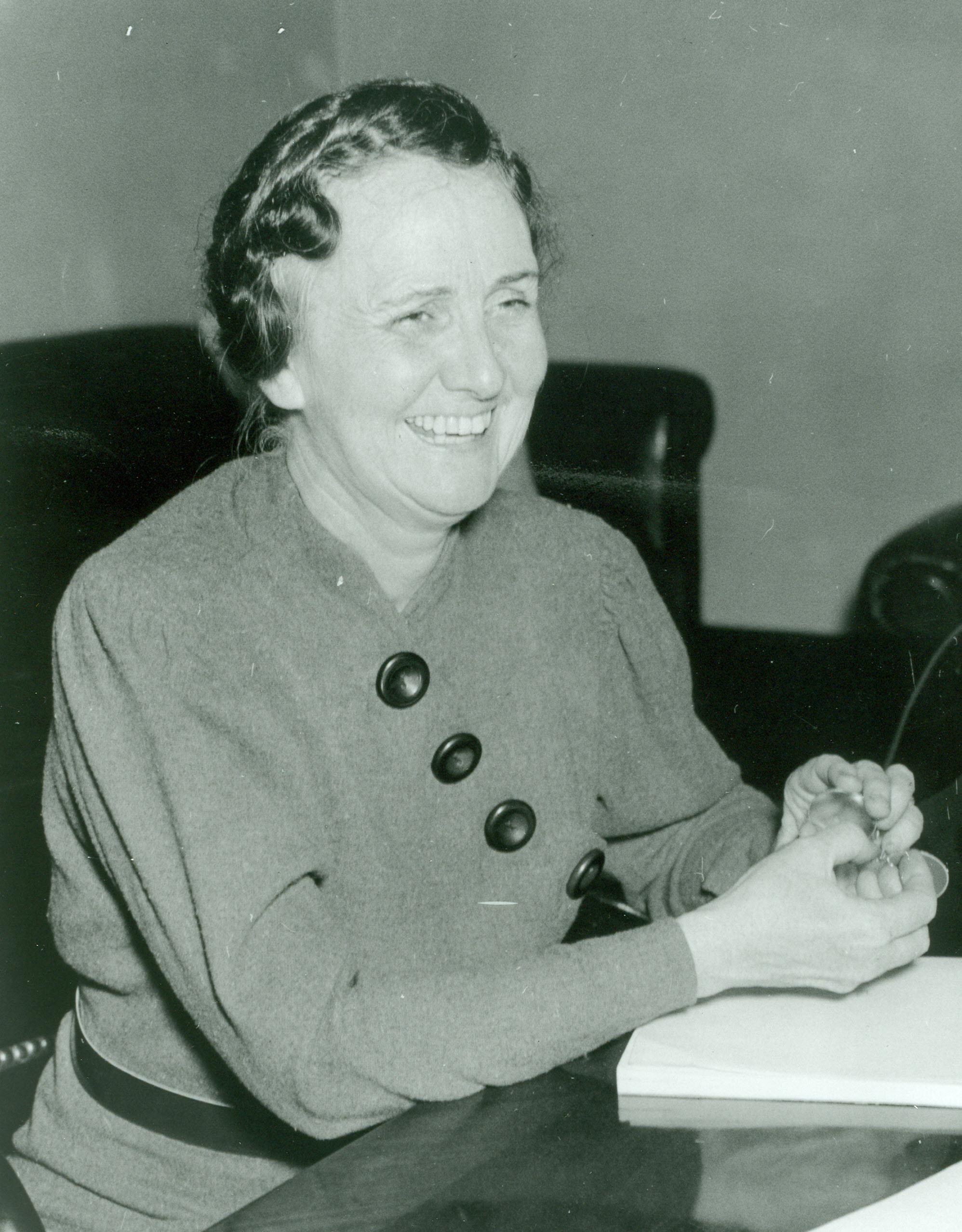

United States Senator from Alabama
- In office August 20, 1937 – January 10, 1938
- Appointed by: Bibb Graves
- Preceded by: Hugo Black
- Succeeded by: Lister Hill

First Lady of Alabama
- In role January 14, 1935 – January 17, 1939
- Governor: Bibb Graves
- Preceded by: Margaret Miller
- Succeeded by: Juliet Dixon
- In role January 17, 1927 – January 19, 1931
- Governor: Bibb Graves
- Preceded by: Elizabeth Brandon
- Succeeded by: Margaret Miller

Personal details
- Born: July 26, 1882 Montgomery, Alabama, U.S.
- Died: January 21, 1965 (aged 82) Montgomery, Alabama, U.S.
- Party: Democratic
- Spouse: Bibb Graves

Dixie Bibb Graves (July 26, 1882 – January 21, 1965) was an American politician. She served as the First Lady of Alabama and was the first woman to serve as a United States senator from Alabama, and only the fourth woman to become a member of the U.S. Senate. She was appointed to the Senate by her husband, Governor Bibb Graves, when Senator Hugo Black resigned in order to serve on the U.S. Supreme Court in August 1937. Graves was succeeded by fellow Democrat Lister Hill, who would serve for over 3 decades.

== Early life ==
Dixie Bibb was born on July 26, 1882, on the family plantation outside of Montgomery, Alabama. Her parents were Peyton and Isabel Thorpe Bibb. She attended the local public schools. In 1900, at the age of 18, she married state legislator David Bibb Graves.

== Civic activities ==
Graves became a civic leader. She was a trustee of Alabama Boys' Industrial School in Birmingham and president of the United Daughters of the Confederacy from 1915 to 1917. She was active in the Woman's Christian Temperance Union, the Alabama Federation of Women’s Clubs, and the women's suffrage movement.

== Senate ==
Her husband, Bibb Graves, became Alabama governor and began serving his second non-consecutive term in 1935. He appointed Dixie Bibb Graves to the U.S. Senate on August 20, 1937. The vacancy was caused by the resignation of Hugo L. Black, who became an Associate Justice on the Supreme Court. Dixie Bibb Graves was the first woman senator from Alabama, and the first married woman to serve in the Senate (all the others had been widows). She served from August 20, 1937, until her resignation on January 10, 1938.

Governor Graves' justified his decision to appoint his wife as interim senator until a special election could be held so as not to favor any of the possible candidates in the special election. The governor would need their continued support for his programs. During her brief tenure, Dixie Bibb Graves voted in support of New Deal programs directed at agriculture, crop control, and labor policy.

== Post-Senate activities ==
Graves was active in many causes, including public welfare, health, and education. During World War II, she recruited for the Women's Army Corps (WACs), and worked for the American Red Cross and the United Service Organizations (USO). One WAC group was designated as the Dixie Bibb Graves Unit. A very active member of the State Advisors on Women's Activities of the National Foundation for Infantile Paralysis, an organization later known as the National March of Dimes Association, she worked for a cure and hospitals to treat polio. She was also chair or honorary chair of the Women's Division of the State Democratic Campaign in 1948, 1952, 1956, and 1960. She was a member of the Alabama Historical Association, the American Legion Auxiliary, the No Name Club, and the United Daughters of the Confederacy.

== Death and legacy ==
Graves died in Montgomery, Montgomery County, Alabama, on January 21, 1965 (age 82 years, 179 days). She is interred at Greenwood Cemetery, Montgomery, Alabama. She was named to the Alabama Women's Hall of Fame in 1972.

The Dixie Bibb Graves Armory was built in Montgomery, Alabama in 1935 as a WPA project, which was converted in the 1990s to the Armory Learning Arts Center.

== See also ==
- Women in the United States Senate

Honorary titles
Preceded by Elizabeth Brandon	First Lady of Alabama; 1927–1931	Succeeded by Margaret Miller
Preceded by Margaret Miller	First Lady of Alabama; 1935–1939	Succeeded by Juliet Dixon
U.S. Senate
Preceded by Hugo Black	United States Senator (Class 3) from Alabama; 1937–1938; Served alongside: John Bankhead	Succeeded by Lister Hill
