= Dianne Bentley =

Former first lady of Alabama

First Lady of Alabama
- In role January 17, 2011 – September 29, 2015
- Governor: Robert J. Bentley
- Preceded by: Patsy Riley
- Succeeded by: Vacant

Personal details
- Born: Martha Dianne Jones; 1944 (age 81–82) Montgomery, Alabama, U.S.
- Party: Republican
- Spouse: Robert J. Bentley (m. 1965; div. 2015)
- Children: 4
- Education: University of Alabama

Martha Dianne Jones Bentley (born 1944) is an American civic leader who served as the First Lady of Alabama from 2011 to 2015. Bentley was married to then-Governor of Alabama Robert J. Bentley until their divorce in September 2015, ending their 50-year marriage. Bentley filed for divorce in August 2015 due to her husband's infidelity. Following their divorce, the scandal led to Governor Bentley's resignation in April 2017.

Born in Montgomery, Alabama, Bentley attended the University of Alabama pursuing a degree in bacteriology. She met Bentley there, and the two were married on July 24, 1965.

== First Lady of Alabama ==
Bentley became the First Lady of Alabama in 2011, and served in that role until the finalization of the divorce between herself and Robert Bentley on September 29, 2015.
