= Fayette County Schools =

School district in Alabama, United States

Fayette County School District is a school district in Fayette County, Alabama.

The District includes:

- Berry Elementary School
- Fayette Elementary School
- Fayette Middle School
- Berry High School
- Fayette County High School
- Hubbertville School
