= Jamelle Folsom =

American First Lady of Alabama, USA

Jamelle Moore Folsom

First Lady of Alabama
- In office January 17, 1955 – January 19, 1959
- Governor: Jim Folsom
- Preceded by: Alice Boyd McKeithen
- Succeeded by: Mary Jo Patterson
- In role May 5, 1948 – January 15, 1951
- Governor: Jim Folsom
- Preceded by: Position vacant (1947-1948)
- Succeeded by: Alice Boyd McKeithen

Personal details
- Born: November 11, 1927 Berry, Alabama, U.S.
- Died: November 30, 2012 (aged 85) Cullman, Alabama, U.S.
- Party: Democratic Party
- Spouse: Jim Folsom (m. 1948; died 1987)
- Children: Jim Folsom, Jr., Andrew Jackson, Alabama, Ebelene, Joshua, Eulala, Melody. Step-Daughters: Rachel, Melissa

Jamelle Moore Folsom (November 11, 1927 – November 30, 2012) was an American civic leader who served as the First Lady of Alabama from 1948 to 1951 and again from 1955 to 1959. The wife and widow of Governor of Alabama James E. "Big Jim" Folsom and mother of former Governor Jim Folsom, Jr., Jamelle Folsom is the only Alabama woman in history to have both married and given birth to a state governor.

== Biography ==
=== Early life ===
Folsom was born Jamelle Moore to E.M. Moore and Ebelene Utley Moore. She was a native of Berry, Alabama, in Fayette County.

=== First Lady of Alabama ===
Folsom met her future husband, Jim Folsom, while attending his campaign rally in Berry, Alabama, in 1946 when she was seventeen years old. Jim Folsom's first wife, Sarah, had died in 1944 due to pregnancy complications, and he had been described at the time as one of Alabama's and the United States' most eligible bachelors. Jim Folsom saw Jamelle listening to his speech while sitting on the hood of a car. He quickly told the crowd, "they sure did have a lot of pretty girls in Berry, Alabama." After the rally, Folsom invited Jamelle to have a drink in a local drugstore and the two quickly began dating. Jim Folsom was elected Governor of Alabama later in 1946 and the pair continued dating for two years. In 1948, Jim and Jamelle eloped and were married by a probate judge, a friend of Governor Folsom's, in Rockford, Alabama. Jamelle Folson served as First Lady of Alabama for the remainder of his first term, beginning in 1948 According to an account by the retired Chairman of the University of Alabama's political science department, William Stewart, Jamelle Folsom played a major role in settling her husband's fast-paced lifestyle, "She seemed to calm him down and she was a very faithful companion to him for the rest of his life." Jamelle Folsom, who was twenty years younger than "Big Jim," had seven children, including Governor Jim Folsom, Jr., as well as two stepchildren from her husband's first marriage. All three of her sons were born during her tenures as First Lady.

Folsom moved to Cullman, Alabama, in 1951 after her husband completed his first, non-consecutive term in office. State law, at the time, forbid any sitting, incumbent Governor from seeking re-election to a second, consecutive term. The Folsoms chose Cullman County to build up his political base in the Northern Alabama region. Jamelle Folsom resumed her duties as First Lady in Montgomery, Alabama, upon her husband's election to a second term.

=== Later life ===
Jim Folsom died in 1987, leaving Jamelle Folsom a widow. Jamelle Folsom returned to government after his death, this time as an executive officer for the Alabama Department of Agriculture and Industries. Originally appointed by former Agriculture and Industry Commissioner A.W. Todd in 1991, Folsom spent eleven years at the agency. Her position proved controversial in its early years, including an unsuccessful move by Republican Agriculture and Industry Commissioner Jack Thompson to eliminate her post soon after he defeated Todd in the 1994 election.

Jamelle Folsom remained active in Alabama politics and other public functions throughout the remainder of her life.

Folsom died at Cullman Regional Medical Center in Cullman, Alabama, at approximately 2:30 p.m on November 30, 2012, at the age of 85. She was survived by five of her seven children: Jim Folsom Jr., Bama Folsom, Thelma Folsom, Melody Folsom, and Layla Folsom, and two stepchildren from Jim Folsom's first marriage, Rachel Lichenstein and Melissa Boyen. Alabama news organizations described the death of the former First Lady as one of the state's top stories of 2012.
