= Virgis M. Ashworth =

American politician (1911–1975)

57th Speaker of the Alabama House of Representatives
- In office 1961–1961
- Preceded by: Charles C. Adams
- Succeeded by: Albert Brewer

Member of the Alabama House of Representatives
- In office 1954–1963

Personal details
- Born: November 25, 1911 Herrin, Illinois, U.S.
- Died: June 18, 1975 (aged 63)
- Party: Democratic
- Education: University of Alabama; Birmingham School of Law

Virgis M. Ashworth (November 25, 1911 – June 18, 1975) was an American politician. He served as a Democratic member of the Alabama House of Representatives.

== Life and career ==
Ashworth was born in Herrin, Illinois. He attended the University of Alabama and Birmingham School of Law.

Ashworth served in the Alabama House of Representatives from 1954 to 1963.

Ashworth died on June 18, 1975 of an apparent suicide, at the age of 63.
