= Berry High School =

Public high school in Berry, Alabama

Location
- 18242 Highway 18 East; Berry, Fayette County, Alabama 35546; United States
- 33°39′46″N 87°35′56″W

Information
- Type: Public, Coeducational
- Founded: 1922 (104 years ago)
- School district: Fayette County Schools
- Superintendent: Jim Burkhalter
- CEEB code: 010300
- Principal: Kim Williams
- Teaching staff: 14.14 (FTE)
- Grades: 7–12
- Enrollment: 245 (2024–2025)
- Student to teacher ratio: 17.33
- Education system: Alabama Department of Education
- Colors: Scarlet Red, Royal Blue & White
- Athletics: Alabama High School Athletic Association (Class 1A)
- Mascot: Wildcats
- Team name: Berry Wildcats
- Rivals: Hubbertville Lions
- Accreditation: Southern Association of Colleges and Schools
- Website: berryhigh.fayette.k12.al.us

Berry High School is a public high school located in Berry, Alabama. It provides education for students in grades 7–12.

== History ==
Berry High School has burned down at least once in its history. The high school has two gyms and is an AHSAA 1A school. It is home to the Berry Wildcats and the Red Regiment Band.

== Notable alumni ==
- Scott Dill, NFL offensive tackle
