= Cornelia Wallace =

First Lady of Alabama (1939–2009)

First Lady of Alabama
- In role January 18, 1971 – January 4, 1978
- Governor: George Wallace
- Preceded by: Martha Farmer Brewer
- Succeeded by: Bobbie Mooney James

Personal details
- Born: Cornelia Ellis; January 28, 1939 Elba, Alabama, U.S
- Died: January 8, 2009 (aged 69) Sebring, Florida, U.S
- Party: Democratic
- Spouses: John Snively III (m. 1962; div. 1970) George Wallace (m. 1971; div. 1978)
- Children: 2
- Education: Huntingdon College; Rollins College

Cornelia Wallace (née Ellis, formerly Snively; January 28, 1939 – January 8, 2009) was an American civic leader who served as the First Lady of Alabama from 1971–1978 as the second wife of Democratic Governor George C. Wallace.

Wallace attracted national attention on May 15, 1972, when, at the age of 33 she threw herself over her husband when he was shot four times by Arthur Bremer during an assassination attempt at a shopping center in Laurel, Maryland. At the time, Wallace was seeking support in his bid for his party's presidential nomination.

== Biography ==
Wallace was born in Elba in southeastern Alabama to Charles G. Ellis, a civil engineer who died in 1960, and "Big Ruby” Folsom Ellis, former Governor James E. “Big Jim” Folsom's sister. Folsom was a widower and in 1947 invited his sister to be First Lady; Cornelia joined her at eight years of age.

Wallace attended Methodist Huntingdon College and Rollins College in Winter Park, Florida, and studied voice and piano. She sang and played guitar and toured Australia and Hawaii with Country music singer Roy Acuff. Wallace wrote and recorded two songs for M-G-M records: "It's No Summer Love" and "Baby with the Barefoot Feet". Following her father's death, she and her mother, who was not wealthy but had many wealthy and influential contacts, often house sat for wealthy friends in Washington, D.C., and other cities in order to live beyond their limited means. She married John Snively, whose family owned the tourist attraction Cypress Gardens near Winter Haven, Florida. The couple had two sons, James and Joshua, but divorced in 1969.

Cornelia Wallace was a niece of George Wallace's intraparty rival, former Governor Jim Folsom, whom Wallace had defeated in the 1962 Democratic primary. She married Wallace on January 4, 1971, shortly before he was inaugurated for the second of his four nonconsecutive terms as governor, and two and a half years following the death of his first wife, former Governor Lurleen Burns Wallace.

== Death and legacy ==
She was portrayed by Angelina Jolie in the TV film George Wallace. The Associated Press stated that the film's version of Cornelia Wallace was depicted as "a shallow sex kitten" and therefore Cornelia Wallace had criticism towards the portrayal.

Wallace died of cancer in Sebring, Florida, on January 8, 2009.

Turnham also recalled that as first lady, Mrs. Wallace urged Alabamians to plant vegetable gardens to be more self-reliant.
