= Patsy Riley =

Patsy Riley is a former First Lady of Alabama. She wrote a book about 11 other First Ladies of Alabama. As First Lady of Alabama she advocated for increased funding for foster parents, a statue of Helen Keller, and refurbishment of the governor's mansion. She also wrote When the Dinner Bell Rings at the Governor's Mansion, a collection of personal stories and recipes. She has been involved in various civic and charitable projects.

She supporting her husband's agenda as Alabama's First Lady and supporting "Home Instruction for Parents of Preschool Youngsters" (HIPPY)
