= Hubbertville, Alabama =

Unincorporated community in Alabama, United States

- Unincorporated community
- Location in Alabama Hubbertville (the United States)
- Coordinates: 33°49′40″N 87°44′24″W
- Country: United States
- State: Alabama
- County: Fayette
- Elevation: 427 ft (130 m)
- Time zone: UTC-6 (Central (CST))
  - Summer (DST): UTC-5 (CDT)
- Postal codes: 35559, 35555, 35594, 35554
- Area codes: 205, 659
- GNIS feature ID: 120496

Hubbertville is a rural incorporated area of Glen Allen located along the west bank of the Sipsey River in north-central Fayette County, Alabama, United States.

== Education ==
- Hubbertville School is in Hubbertville.

== Notable people ==
- Paul Hubbert, politician, born in Hubbertville
