= Martha Farmer Brewer =

American politician

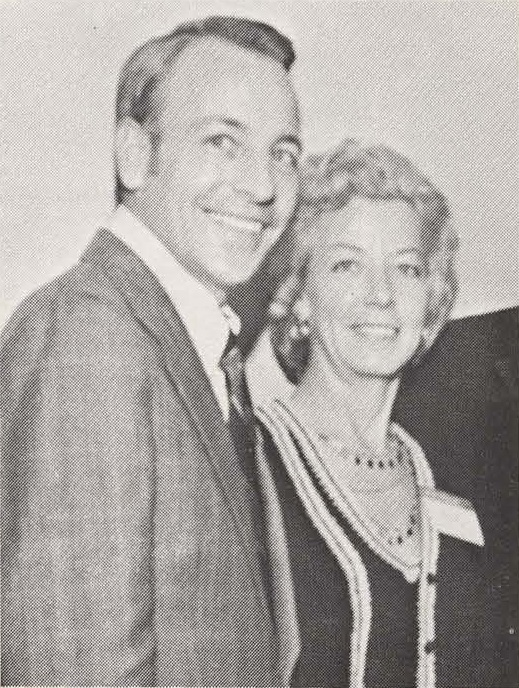

First Lady of Alabama
- In role May 7, 1968 – January 18, 1971
- Governor: Albert Brewer
- Preceded by: George Wallace (First Gentleman)
- Succeeded by: Bobbie James

Second Lady of Alabama
- In role January 16, 1967 – May 7, 1968
- Governor: Lurleen Wallace
- Preceded by: Marjorie Allen
- Succeeded by: Sara Beasley

Personal details
- Born: October 27, 1930 Anniston, Alabama, U.S.
- Died: November 14, 2006 (aged 76) Vestavia Hills, Alabama, U.S.
- Party: Democratic
- Spouse: Albert Brewer (m. 1950)
- Education: University of Alabama

Martha Farmer Brewer (October 27, 1930 – November 14, 2006) was the wife of Alabama's 49th governor Albert Brewer and the former First Lady of Alabama.

She was born in Anniston, Alabama and raised in Chattanooga, Tennessee. While attending college at the University of Alabama she met Albert Brewer. The two were married for 56 years. Brewer and her husband were devoted to each other, and they had a close and physically affectionate marriage.

Albert Brewer served as governor until January 1971. He lost a battle for the 1970 Democratic gubernatorial nomination to George Wallace.

Martha Brewer died on November 14, 2006, in Vestavia Hills, Alabama. Her memorial service was held at the Mountain Brook Baptist Church.
