= Monroe County Airport (Alabama) =

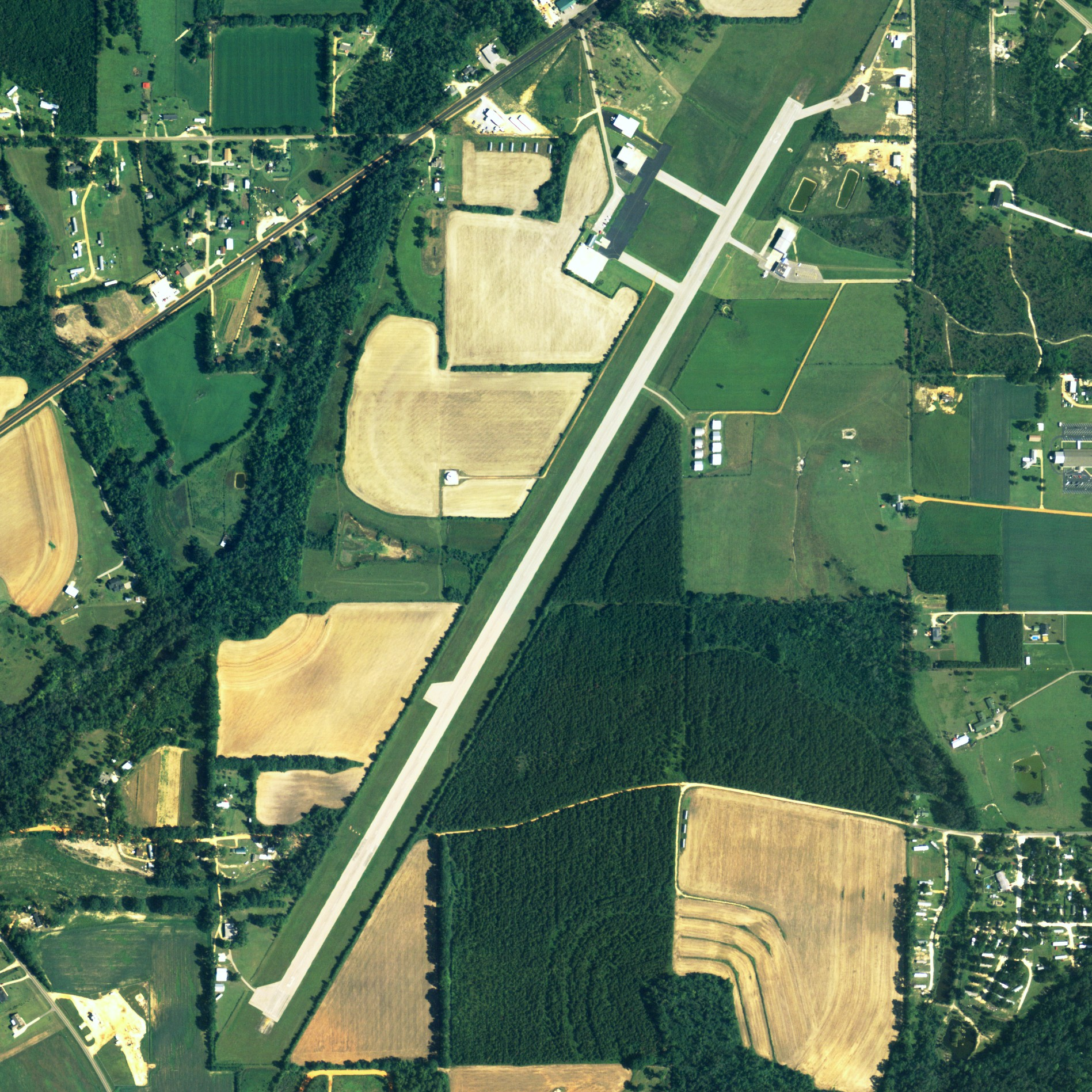
- NAIP aerial image, 2006
- IATA: MVC; ICAO: KMVC; FAA LID: MVC

Summary
- Airport type: Public
- Owner: Monroe County
- Serves: Monroeville, Alabama
- Elevation AMSL: 419 ft / 128 m
- Coordinates: 31°27′29″N 087°21′04″W
- Interactive map of Monroe County Airport

Runways
| Direction | Length | | Surface |
| Direction | ft | m | Surface |
|---|---|---|---|
| 3/21 | 6,028 | 1,837 | Asphalt |

Statistics (2009)
- Aircraft operations: 20,100
- Based aircraft: 16
- Source: Federal Aviation Administration

Monroe County Airport (IATA: MVC, ICAO: KMVC, FAA LID: MVC) is a county-owned public-use airport located three nautical miles (6 km) south of the central business district of Monroeville, in Monroe County, Alabama, United States. According to the FAA's National Plan of Integrated Airport Systems for 2009–2013, it is categorized as a general aviation facility.

== Facilities and aircraft ==
Monroe County Airport covers an area of 56 acres (23 ha) at an elevation of 419 feet (128 m) above mean sea level. It has one runway designated 3/21 with an asphalt surface measuring 6,028 by 100 feet (1,837 x 30 m).

For the 12-month period ending July 14, 2009, the airport had 20,100 aircraft operations, an average of 55 per day: 95% general aviation and 5% military. At that time there were 16 aircraft based at this airport: 75% single-engine, 13% multi-engine, 6% jet and 6% helicopter.

== See also ==
- List of airports in Alabama
