= Berry, Alabama =

Town in Fayette County, Alabama, U.S.

- Town
- Seal

- Location of Berry in Fayette County, Alabama.
- Coordinates: 33°39′28″N 87°37′21″W
- Country: United States
- State: Alabama
- County: Fayette

Government
  - Type: Mayor-Council
  - Mayor: Jimmy Madison

Area
  - Total: 10.77 sq mi (27.90 km^{2})
  - Land: 10.76 sq mi (27.88 km^{2})
  - Water: 0.0077 sq mi (0.02 km^{2})
- Elevation: 463 ft (141 m)

Population (2020)
  - Total: 1,216
  - Density: 112.9/sq mi (43.61/km^{2})
- Time zone: UTC-6 (Central (CST))
  - Summer (DST): UTC-5 (CDT)
- ZIP code: 35546
- Area codes: 205, 659
- FIPS code: 01-05932
- GNIS feature ID: 2405250
- Website: townofberryalabama.org

Berry is a town in Fayette County, Alabama, United States. As of the 2020 census, Berry had a population of 1,216.

== History ==
The town was named for Thompson Berry, a local landowner. The town incorporated in 1883 as "Berry Station". However, the first elections were not held until 1899 and the town did not appear on the U.S. Census until 1900. In the 1920s, it shortened its name to Berry. On April 27, 2011, the town was struck twice by tornadoes.

== Geography ==
Berry is located in southeastern Fayette County. Alabama State Route 18 runs through the town, leading west 17 miles (27 km) to Fayette, the county seat, and east 16 miles (26 km) to Oakman.

According to the U.S. Census Bureau, the town has a total area of 10.8 square miles (27.9 km^{2}), of which 0.006 square miles (0.015 km^{2}), or 0.05%, is water. The town lies between the North River and its tributary, Cedar Creek. It is part of the watershed of the Black Warrior River, the principal tributary of the Tombigbee River.

== Demographics ==
Historical population
Census	Pop.	Note	%±
1900	245		—
1910	372		51.8%
1920	491		32.0%
1930	500		1.8%
1940	639		27.8%
1950	715		11.9%
1960	645		−9.8%
1970	679		5.3%
1980	916		34.9%
1990	1,218		33.0%
2000	1,238		1.6%
2010	1,148		−7.3%
2020	1,216		5.9%
U.S. Decennial Census; 2013 Estimate

=== Racial and ethnic composition ===
Berry town, Alabama – Racial and ethnic composition Note: the US Census treats Hispanic/Latino as an ethnic category. This table excludes Latinos from the racial categories and assigns them to a separate category. Hispanics/Latinos may be of any race. Race and ethnicity were not surveyed for populations under 2,500 in 1980 and under 1,000 in 1990.
Race / Ethnicity (NH = Non-Hispanic)	Pop 1990	Pop 2000	Pop 2010	Pop 2020	% 1990	% 2000	% 2010	% 2020
White alone (NH)	1,102	1,126	1,040	1,033	90.48%	90.95%	90.59%	84.95%
Black or African American alone (NH)	110	79	85	85	9.03%	6.38%	7.40%	6.99%
Native American or Alaska Native alone (NH)	2	4	0	4	0.16%	0.32%	0.00%	0.33%
Asian alone (NH)	0	0	0	2	0.00%	0.00%	0.00%	0.16%
Native Hawaiian or Pacific Islander alone (NH)	x	0	0	0	x	0.00%	0.00%	0.00%
Other race alone (NH)	0	0	0	8	0.00%	0.00%	0.00%	0.66%
Mixed race or Multiracial (NH)	x	8	14	61	x	0.65%	1.22%	5.02%
Hispanic or Latino (any race)	4	21	9	23	0.33%	1.70%	0.78%	1.89%
Total	1,218	1,238	1,148	1,216	100.00%	100.00%	100.00%	100.00%

=== 2020 census ===
As of the 2020 census, Berry had a population of 1,216. The median age was 40.1 years. 26.2% of residents were under the age of 18 and 16.0% of residents were 65 years of age or older. For every 100 females there were 86.8 males, and for every 100 females age 18 and over there were 81.8 males age 18 and over.

0.0% of residents lived in urban areas, while 100.0% lived in rural areas.

There were 505 households in Berry, of which 35.0% had children under the age of 18 living in them. Of all households, 41.8% were married-couple households, 17.6% were households with a male householder and no spouse or partner present, and 35.8% were households with a female householder and no spouse or partner present. About 34.5% of all households were made up of individuals and 11.5% had someone living alone who was 65 years of age or older.

There were 552 housing units, of which 8.5% were vacant. The homeowner vacancy rate was 0.6% and the rental vacancy rate was 4.7%.

=== 2010 census ===
At the 2010 census there were 1,148 people, 506 households, and 316 families living in the town. The population density was 110 inhabitants per square mile (42/km^{2}). There were 596 housing units at an average density of 53.2 units per square mile (20.5 units/km^{2}). The racial makeup of the town was 90.8% White, 7.4% Black or African American, 0.0% Native American, .6% from other races, and 1.2% from two or more races. .8% of the population were Hispanic or Latino of any race. Of the 506 households 26.7% had children under the age of 18 living with them, 41.5% were married couples living together, 16.0% had a female householder with no husband present, and 37.5% were non-families. 35.2% of households were one person and 14.6% were one person aged 65 or older. The average household size was 2.27 and the average family size was 2.90.

The age distribution was 24.5% under the age of 18, 9.2% from 18 to 24, 22.5% from 25 to 44, 28.8% from 45 to 64, and 15.0% 65 or older. The median age was 40.1 years. For every 100 females, there were 94.9 males. For every 100 females age 18 and over, there were 93.6 males.

The median household income was $20,792 and the median family income was $32,350. Males had a median income of $26,346 versus $26,250 for females. The per capita income for the town was $12,960. About 20.8% of families and 27.1% of the population were below the poverty line, including 19.9% of those under age 18 and 29.6% of those age 65 or over.

=== 2000 census ===
At the 2000 census there were 1,238 people, 516 households, and 352 families living in the town. The population density was 110.8 inhabitants per square mile (42.8/km^{2}). There were 574 housing units at an average density of 51.4 units per square mile (19.8 units/km^{2}). The racial makeup of the town was 91.44% White, 6.38% Black or African American, 0.32% Native American, 1.05% from other races, and 0.81% from two or more races. 1.70% of the population were Hispanic or Latino of any race. Of the 516 households 32.8% had children under the age of 18 living with them, 49.0% were married couples living together, 15.5% had a female householder with no husband present, and 31.6% were non-families. 29.7% of households were one person and 13.0% were one person aged 65 or older. The average household size was 2.40 and the average family size was 2.96.

The age distribution was 26.9% under the age of 18, 9.5% from 18 to 24, 25.8% from 25 to 44, 24.7% from 45 to 64, and 13.0% 65 or older. The median age was 36 years. For every 100 females, there were 88.7 males. For every 100 females age 18 and over, there were 81.7 males.

The median household income was $20,214 and the median family income was $26,083. Males had a median income of $28,500 versus $20,714 for females. The per capita income for the town was $12,635. About 31.4% of families and 32.1% of the population were below the poverty line, including 44.1% of those under age 18 and 30.2% of those age 65 or over.

== Education ==
The town of Berry has one elementary school and one high school. Berry Elementary School has grades Pre-K-6. Berry High School includes grades 7–12. The mascot for both schools is the wildcat.

== Industry ==
Berry has the headquarters of Stallion Trailers, Pittsburgh-Midway Chevron Mine, and Piggly Wiggly Grocers. Small businesses such as shops and restaurants also contribute to the town's economy. The Bank of Berry, founded in 1911, was privately owned until 2002, when it was purchased by First National Bank of Hamilton.

== Notable people ==
- Jamelle Folsom, former First Lady of Alabama (1948–1951, 1955–1959)
- Bettye Kimbrell (1936–2016), master folk artist for quilting
- Fuller Kimbrell, member of the Alabama State Senate from 1947 to 1955
