= Buhl, Alabama =

- Unincorporated community
- Location within Alabama Location within the United States
- Coordinates: 33°15′25″N 87°45′10″W
- Country: United States
- State: Alabama
- County: Tuscaloosa
- Elevation: 269 ft (82 m)
- Time zone: UTC-6 (Central (CST))
  - Summer (DST): UTC-5 (CDT)
- ZIP code: 35446
- Area codes: 205, 659
- GNIS feature ID: 115168

Buhl is an unincorporated community in Tuscaloosa County, Alabama, United States, located 11.1 miles (17.9 km) west-northwest of Tuscaloosa. Buhl has a post office with ZIP code 35446. The community is home to Buhl Elementary School, which is part of the Tuscaloosa County School System. Buhl is named for a Mr. Buhl, who was an employee of the Mobile and Ohio Railroad.

== See also ==
- Unincorporated communities in Alabama
