= Hubbertville School =

High school in Alabama, United States

Location
- 7360 Co. Rd. 49, Fayette, AL 35555; Hubbertville, Fayette County, Alabama; United States; 33°49′47″N 87°44′32″W

Information
- Type: Public, Coeducational
- Founded: 1923 (103 years ago)
- School district: Fayette County Schools
- Superintendent: Jimothy Barkhulter
- Principal: Tim Dunavant
- Staff: 43
- Grades: PK-12
- Education system: Alabama Department of Education
- Campus type: Rural
- Colors: Maroon, Light Gray & White
- Athletics: Alabama High School Athletic Association (Class 1A)
- Athletics conference: Northwest Alabama Conference
- Mascot: Lions
- Team name: Hubbertville Lions
- Rivals: Berry Wildcats
- Accreditation: Southern Association of Colleges and Schools
- Website: hubbertville.fayette.k12.al.us

Hubbertville School is located in the community of Hubbertville in North Fayette County, Alabama. Hub, as it is known locally, is a PK – 12 school serving approximately 420 students annually.

Hubbertville School was established in 1923 from the consolidation of New River, Hickory Rock, Pleasant View, and Hubbert Schools. It adopted the African Lion as its mascot.

According to the Alabama State Department of Education's Assessment Reporting System 81.48% of 2014-2015 grade 10 students partially met academic content standards in the ACT PLAN's English subject area; 51.85% fully met this standard. These percentages were 48.15% and 22.22% for Science and 70.37% and 18.52% for Math, respectively.

U.S. News & World Report's 2017 scorecard for Hubbertville School reports 19% proficiency in Mathematics and 52% in English. U.S. News & World Report also indicate that student mastery of state exit exams (state test performance index) is 65.7 points. This is 10.7 points higher than expected when accounting for socioeconomic status of students. Overall, middle and high school students scored at or above college-readiness benchmarks or rank above the 50th percentile in select subject areas, with many subject area scores trending upwards. The student to teacher ratio is 18:1, the proportion of "highly qualified" teachers (approximately 60% holding advanced degrees), and strong community support.

Hubbertville School has won class 1A state championships in football, basketball, and softball. The Lions finished runner-up in the class 1A football playoffs during the 2014 season under head coach Lamar Harris. In 2017, Hubbertville's baseball team played its first home game following the revival of the school's varsity baseball program in 2014.
