= Leslie Doss =

John Leslie Doss Jr. (August 9, 1929 – November 14, 2011) was a lawyer and state legislator in Alabama. He served in the Alabama House of Representatives, representing the 6th district (elected 1966).

Doss died on November 14, 2011, at the age of 82.
