= Elrod, Alabama =

- Unincorporated community
- Location within Alabama Location within the United States
- Coordinates: 33°15′22″N 87°47′32″W
- Country: United States
- State: Alabama
- County: Tuscaloosa
- Elevation: 246 ft (75 m)
- Time zone: UTC-6 (Central (CST))
  - Summer (DST): UTC-5 (CDT)
- ZIP code: 35458
- Area codes: 205, 659
- GNIS feature ID: 117963

Elrod is an unincorporated community in Tuscaloosa County, Alabama, United States. Elrod is located on County Route 15, 13.3 miles (21.4 km) west-northwest of Tuscaloosa. Elrod has a post office with ZIP code 35458. Elrod was renamed from Sipsey Turnpike in 1898 after the Mobile and Ohio Railroad reached the community. It was named in honor of William W. Elrod, a local physician.

== Climate ==
The climate in this area is characterized by hot, humid summers and generally mild to cool winters. According to the Köppen Climate Classification system, Elrod has a humid subtropical climate, abbreviated "Cfa" on climate maps.
