= Alabama Governor's Mansion =

Historic house in Alabama, United States

- Governor's Mansion
- U.S. National Register of Historic Places
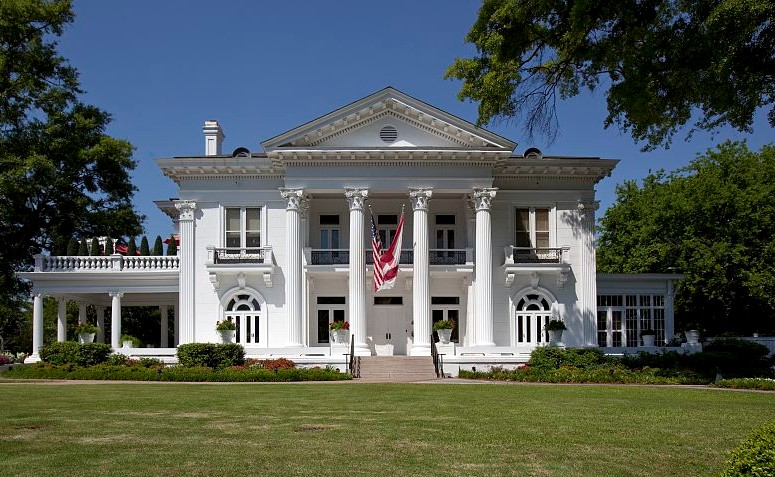

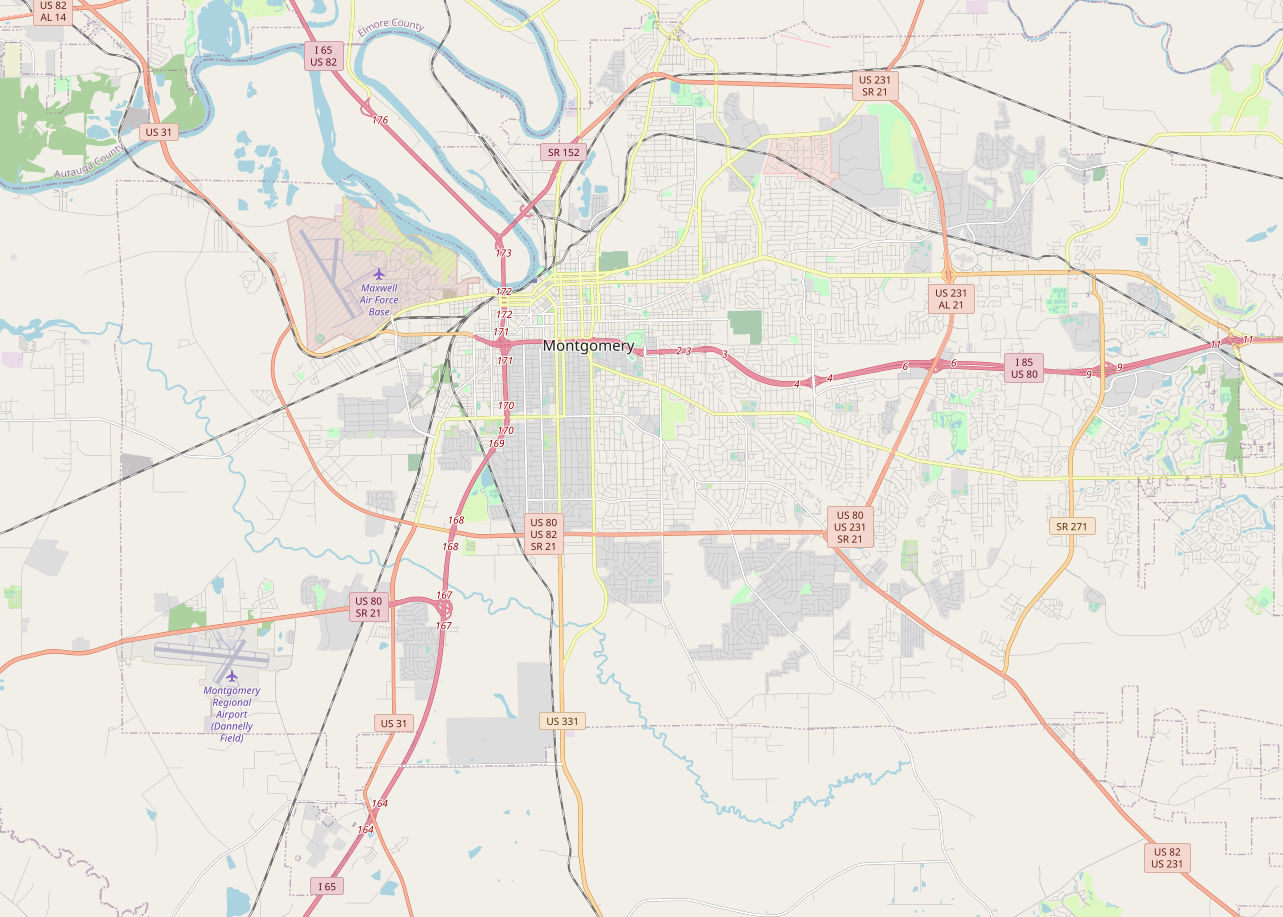
- Location within Montgomery, Alabama Location within Alabama Location within the United States
- Location: 1142 S. Perry St., Montgomery, Alabama
- Coordinates: 32°21′43″N 86°18′27″W
- Area: 2 acres (0.81 ha)
- Built: 1908
- Architect: Weatherly Carter
- Architectural style: Neoclassical Revival
- NRHP reference No.: 72000172
- Added to NRHP: July 3, 1972

The Alabama Governor's Mansion is the official residence of the governor of Alabama and the governor's family in Montgomery, the capital city of Alabama. The current Governor of Alabama, Kay Ivey lives at the governor's mansion. The original governor's mansion for Alabama was occupied from 1911 until 1950, when the current mansion was acquired. The current mansion was added to the National Register of Historic Places on July 3, 1972.

== First residence ==
The first official residence for Alabama's governor was acquired in 1911. Prior to that time, governors of the state lived in private homes or local hotels during their terms of office. The first residence was built by Moses Sabel in 1906. The house, a Beaux Arts brownstone, was located on the southwest corner of South Perry and South Streets in Montgomery.

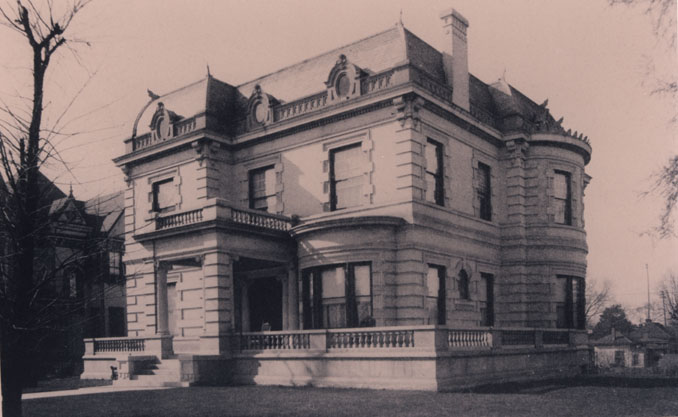
The first Alabama Governor's Mansion

It was purchased for use as an executive mansion by a special state commission, formed by an act of the Alabama Legislature. This commission was authorized to contract for the construction, purchase, or improvement of a residence and the acquisition of grounds. The former Sabel home cost the state $46,500. Governor Emmet O'Neal was the first to occupy the mansion and Jim Folsom was the last. The state relocated the official residence from this house to the former Robert Ligon, Jr. house in 1950. The old residence was then used as state offices for the Adjutant General and the Military Department until May 1959, when the property was sold to Montgomery Academy, a private secondary school. It was subsequently condemned and demolished in 1963 as part of the construction of Interstate 85.

== Current residence ==
The current official residence for the governor replaced the first executive mansion in 1950. Designed in the Classical Revival or Neoclassical style by the architect Weatherly Carter, it was built in 1907 for Robert Fulwood Ligon, Jr., son of General Robert Fulwood Ligon. The house was purchased by the state for $100,000, with an additional $130,000 spent on renovations and furnishings. Governor Gordon Persons and his family were the first to occupy the former Ligon home, assuming possession of it the day of his inauguration, January 15, 1951.

The most prominent features of the exterior are a monumental Corinthian composite tetrastyle portico at the front, recessed wrought iron balconies on the second level, and an elaborate Ionic porte-cochère to one side.

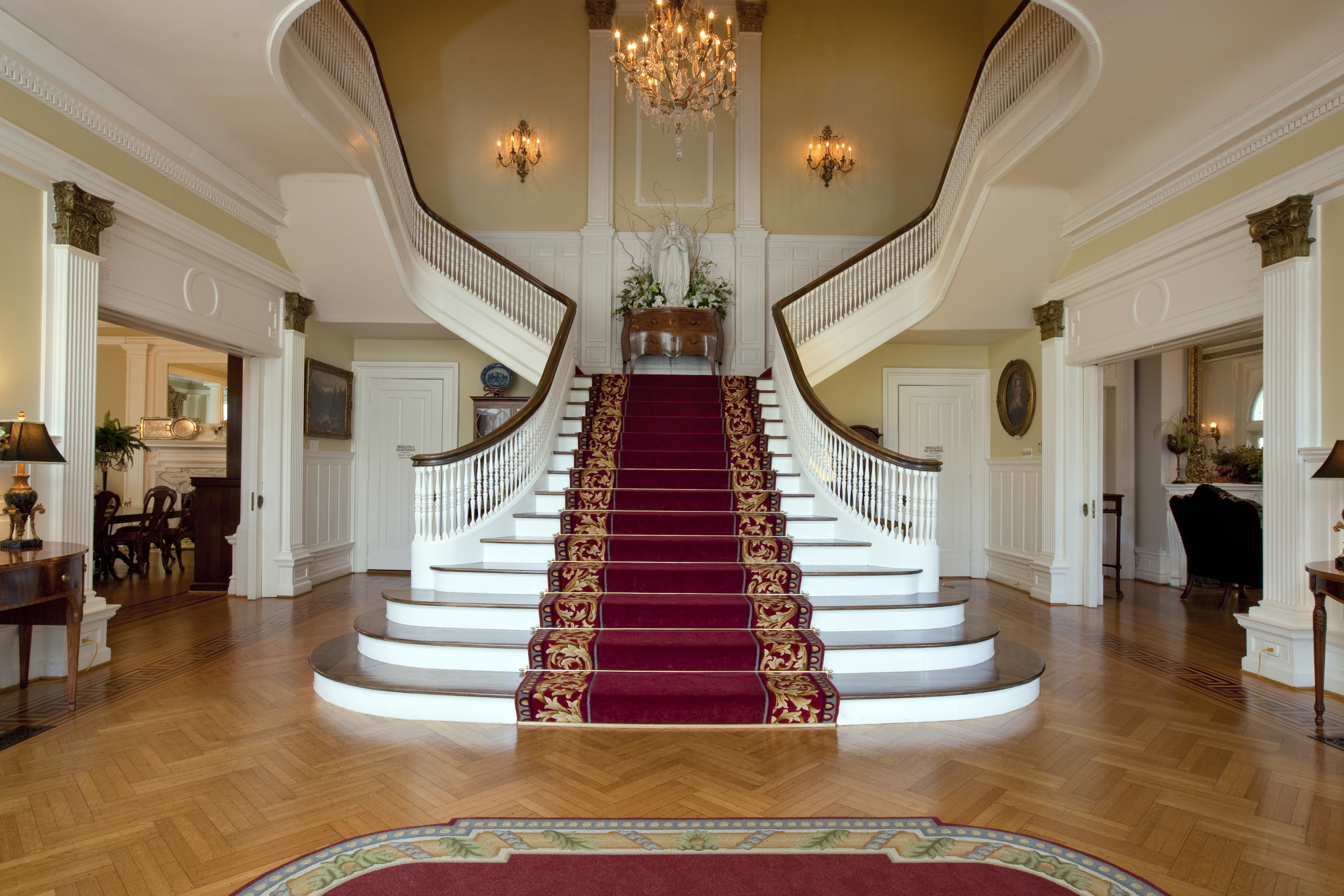
The main staircase in the entrance hall

The interior features 17 primary rooms, with a double staircase leading from the entrance hall to the second level. A formal garden, surrounded by a high ornamental wall, originally covered the entire rear grounds of the property, which extends through the city block to South Court Street. These grounds now feature gardens, a large pergola, a swimming pool in the shape of the state, a guest house, a stone grotto water feature, and tennis courts. The entire property is surrounded by a wrought iron fence, with octagonal guard houses at the main gates.

In 2003, Patsy Riley, wife of then-Governor Bob Riley, coordinated an effort to renovate and reopen the Governor's Mansion to tourists. The mansion had been closed to tourism for almost a decade. She and her "First Lady and Friends of the Mansion" organization raised private funds and donations to finance this effort. It did not involve any taxpayer money.
