= Fuller Kimbrell =

American politician (1909–2013)

Member of the Alabama Senate
- In office 1947–1955

Personal details
- Born: Fuller Asbury Kimbrell; June 22, 1909 Berry, Alabama, U.S.
- Died: June 17, 2013 (aged 103)
- Party: Democratic
- Occupation: Politician, author

Fuller Asbury Kimbrell (June 22, 1909 – June 17, 2013) was an American politician and author.

Born in Berry, Alabama, he owned metal pipe and asphalt plants and a John Deere dealership. He served in the Alabama State Senate from 1947 to 1955 as a Democrat and was an advisor to the Governors of Alabama. Kimbrell served as Alabama State Finance Director. He wrote three books about his life: From the Farm House to the State House, You Wouldn't Believe, But It's So, and It made a Difference.
