= Alabama State Route 96 =

State highway in Alabama, United States

State Route 96

Route information
- Maintained by ALDOT
- Length: 30.680 mi (49.375 km)

Major junctions
- West end: MS 50 at the Mississippi state line west of Millport
- SR 17 from Millport to Kennedy
- East end: SR 18 in Fayette

Location
- Country: United States
- State: Alabama
- Counties: Lamar; Fayette

Highway system
- Alabama State Highway System; Interstate; US; State
| ← SR 95 | → SR 97 |

State Route 96 (SR 96) is a 30.680-mile (49.375 km) east–west state highway in Lamar and Fayette counties in western Alabama, United States, that runs nearly entirely along the southern edge of the valley formed by Luxapallila Creek and connects Mississippi Highway 50 (MS 50) with Alabama State Route 18 (SR 18).

== Route description ==
=== Lamar County ===
SR 96 begins at the eastern terminus of MS 50 in the southwest corner of Lamar County, at the border of Mississippi and about 5 miles (8.0 km) east of Columbus, Mississippi. (MS 50 heads westerly to northwestern Columbus and a junction with U.S. Route 82.) From its western terminus, SR 96 runs easterly as a two-lane road. (For nearly the length of its route, SR 96 runs roughly parallel to, but south of, Luxapallila Creek and the Luxapalila Valley Railroad tracks.) From the state line, SR 96 heads east-northeast for about 6 miles (9.7 km) to reach a T intersection with the northern end of Liberty Road (Lamar County Road 75). Continuing east for about 5 more miles (8.0 km), it crosses Gentry Creek, Shelton Branch, and Propst Creek, as it enters the town of Millport. Just before crossing Propst Creek, the route widens to four lanes.

Within Millport the road signed as "HWY 96" as it continues east to cross several city streets, including College Drive (which is also signed as Lamar County Road 27 heading south), before reaching the T intersection with northbound Alabama State Route 17 (SR 17) in the middle of town. (Within Millport, except for its concurrency with SR 96, SR 17 is signed as "HWY 17".) From that junction SR 17 heads north (crossing Luxapallila Creek) toward Hightogy and Vernon; and SR 96 continues east as a three-lane (with a center left-turn lane) running concurrent with southbound SR 17, but still signed as "HWY 96". After crossing Driver Creek and several more city streets SR 96/SR 17 connects with the northern end of Lamar County Road 3 (signed as "County Rd 3"). Just east of this junction the route returns to a two-lane road (losing its center left-turn lane) and remains as such for the remainder of the route. Turning slightly north, SR 96/SR 17 connects with the ends of several more city streets and crosses Crane Creek before leaving Millport.

After heading east-northeast for about 2 miles (3.2 km) SR 96/SR 17 crosses Rushing Creek and Clear Creek before reaching the town of Kennedy. Just after entering town, SR 96/SR 17 reaches a T intersection with southbound SR 17. (Within Kennedy, except for its concurrency with SR 96, SR 17 is again signed as "HWY 17".) From that junction, SR 17 heads southerly toward Palmetto and Reform; and SR 96 continues east-northeast. After connecting with the ends of several city streets, SR 96 crosses Lamar County Road 49 (CR 49) at a four-way intersection in the center of town. (CR 49 heads north as Alley Street [crossing Luxapallila Creek] toward Kingville and south as Pickens Street to SR 17.) After connecting with the ends of several more city streets, SR 96 reaches a T intersection with the northern end of Gorto Road (Lamar County Road 2) before leaving Kennedy. Upon leaving Kennedy, the route turns north-northeast and, about 2.7 miles (4.3 km) later, the route leaves Lamar County and enters Fayette County.

=== Fayette County ===
Just after entering Fayette County, SR 96 very briefly curves north and slightly west before curving back to a northeastern course. About 1 mile (1.6 km) into the county, SR 96 enters the town of Belk and quickly comes to a T intersection with the northern end of Fayette County Road 1 (CR 1), which heads south-southeasterly to connect with the northern end of Fayette County Road 4 and then ends at Alabama State Route 159. After the junction with CR 1, SR 96 turns north-northeast to cross Beaver Creek and then connect with the ends of several city streets before crossing Fayette County Road 6 (CR 6) at a four-way intersection. (CR 6 heads northwest [crossing Luxapallila Creek] to a junction with the eastern end of Lamar County Road 20 and then quickly ends at Lamar County Road 41. SR 6 heads southeasterly to end at a junction with Fayette County Road 4.) Continuing north-northeast within Belk, SR 96 (now also signed as "1st Street" through the rest of [the north part of] town) connects with the ends of several more city streets before turning northeast and leaving town.

Just after leaving Belk, SR 96 connects with the western end of Fayette County Road 16 (CR 16) at a T intersection. (CR 16 forms a southern loop off of SR 96, connecting with the western end of Fayette County Road 108 [CR 108] along the way.) About 2 miles (3.2 km) further on, SR 96 reaches the southern end of Fayette County Road 37 (CR 37) at another T intersection within the unincorporated community of Covin. (CR 37 heads east to cross Luxapalila Valley Railroad and then north to cross Fayette County Route 23 before ending at SR 18.) Also in Covin, SR 96 turns easterly (leaving the valley of the Luxapalila Creek) and continues on to a T intersection with the southern end of Fayette County Road 21 South (CR 21) in the unincorporated community of Cedar Hill. (CR 21 heads north to a junction with SR 18.) Just after the CR 21 junction, SR 96 comes to its eastern junction with CR 16 at another T intersection, also in Cedar Hill. (This section of the CR 16 loop is signed as Country Club Road.) About 0.8 miles (1.3 km) further east, SR 96 connects with Fayette County Road 106 (CR 106) at a four-way intersection. (CR 106 heads north as Taylor Road to connect with SR 18 in the city of Fayette and south as Valley View Road to end at CR 108.)

SR 96 then enters Fayette and quickly, but very briefly, turns north, then northeast before reaching its western terminus at SR 18 (Columbus Street West) at a three-way intersection on the western edge of the main part of town. (SR 18 heads northwest to Vernon and then southwest to the Mississippi state line [terminating at the northern end of Mississippi Highway 12]. SR 18 heads easterly to connect with U.S. Route 43 [US 43] at the northern end of Alabama State Route 107. SR 18 then leaves Fayette and continues east, running concurrent with US 43 for just over 13 miles [21 km] until US 43 turns south, while SR 18 continues east-northeasterly to its eastern terminus at Alabama State Route 69, just south of Oakman.)

== Major intersections ==
| County | Location | mi | km | Destinations | Notes |
|---|---|---|---|---|---|
| Lamar | | 0.000 | 0.000 | MS 50 west – Columbus | Mississippi state line |
| Lamar | Millport | 11.587 | 18.647 | SR 17 north – Vernon, Sulligent | Western end of SR 17 concurrency |
| Lamar | Kennedy | 15.844 | 25.498 | SR 17 south – Reform | Eastern end of SR 17 concurrency |
| Fayette | Fayette | 30.680 | 49.375 | SR 18 – Vernon, Fayette, Winfield, Airport | Eastern terminus |
1.000 mi = 1.609 km; 1.000 km = 0.621 mi: Concurrency terminus

== See also ==
- List of highways numbered 96
