= Kingville, Alabama =

Unincorporated community in Alabama, United States

- Unincorporated community
- Location within Alabama Location within the United States
- Coordinates: 33°40′03″N 88°02′26″W
- Country: United States
- State: Alabama
- County: Lamar
- Elevation: 420 ft (130 m)
- Time zone: UTC-6 (Central (CST))
  - Summer (DST): UTC-5 (CDT)
- ZIP Code: 35574
- Area codes: 205, 659
- GNIS feature ID: 156561

Kingville is an unincorporated community in southern Lamar County, Alabama, United States, about 6.6 miles (10.6 km) north-northwest of the town of Kennedy.

== History ==
A post office operated in the community under the name Kingville from 1877 to 1905.

== Transportation ==
The community is served by three Lamar County roads:

- CR 20 (Lamar County Road 20) – north-northwest to State Route 17 (SR 17), just south of Hightogy, and east toward Belk (in Fayette County)
- CR 24 (Lamar County Road 24) – southwest to SR 17
- CR 49 (Lamar County Road 49) – north to State Route 18 and Beaverton and south to Kennedy and State Route 96
