= Palmetto, Alabama =

Unincorporated community in Alabama, United States

- Unincorporated community
- Location within Alabama Location within the United States
- Coordinates: 33°29′02″N 87°58′40″W
- Country: United States
- State: Alabama
- County: Pickens
- Elevation: 361 ft (110 m)
- Time zone: UTC-6 (Central (CST))
  - Summer (DST): UTC-5 (CDT)
- ZIP Code: 35481
- Area codes: 205, 659
- GNIS feature ID: 124391

Palmetto is an unincorporated community in northeastern Pickens County, Alabama, United States.

== History ==
Palmetto was named for Palmetto, another unincorporated community in South Carolina. A post office operated under the name Palmetto from 1853 to 1905.

== Transportation ==
The community is served by an Alabama state highway and two Pickens County roads:

- SR 17 (Alabama State Route 17) – north to Kennedy and State Route 96 (in Lamar County) and south to Reform
- CR 3 (Pickens County Road 3/Old Pickens Road) – south to Reform and SR 17
- CR 59 (Pickens County Road 59) – northeast to Pickens County Road 51 and Ashcraft Corner (in Fayette County)
