= Alabama State Route 18 =

State highway in Alabama, United States

State Route 18

Route information
- Maintained by ALDOT
- Length: 61.591 mi (99.121 km)

Major junctions
- West end: MS 12 at the Mississippi state line west of Vernon
- SR 17 at Vernon; US 43 / SR 171 at Fayette; SR 107 at Fayette
- East end: SR 69 at Oakman

Location
- Country: United States
- State: Alabama
- Counties: Lamar, Fayette, Walker

Highway system
- Alabama State Highway System; Interstate; US; State
← SR 17	→ SR 19

State Route 18 (SR 18) is a 61.591-mile-long (99.121 km) state highway in northwest Alabama.

== Route description ==
SR 18 begins at the Mississippi state line near Vernon. In Vernon, it junctions with SR 17. It continues on its curvy route east, then southeast to the Fayette County line.

It then junctions with SR 107. It turns south and junctions with SR 96 west. It then junctions with US 43 north and SR 171. It continues southeast with US 43 south. It makes an unusual curve south in Stough. It turns east again and junctions with SR 13. SR 13 continues north independently and continues south with US 43 at this junction. It does not maintain a concurrency past this point. The route passes through Berry and maintains a concurrency with CR 63. After this concurrency ends, SR 18 continues east on its own route. It passes through hilly terrain and crosses into Walker County.

After continuing through hilly terrain for multiple more miles, the route ends in Oakman, just south of Jasper, at SR 69. SR 69 continues north on SR 18's right-of-way at this point and continues south at a new right-of-way.

== Major intersections ==
County	Location	mi	km	Destinations	Notes
Lamar		0.00	0.00	MS 12 west – Columbus	Mississippi state line
Lamar	Vernon	9.84	15.84	SR 17 (Pond Street) – Sulligent, Millport	
Fayette		24.31	39.12	SR 107 north	Southern terminus of SR 107
Fayette	Fayette	27.71	44.59	SR 96 west – Kennedy, Millport, Reform	Eastern terminus of SR 96
Fayette	Fayette	28.61	46.04	US 43 north / SR 171 (2nd Avenue) – Airport	Western end of US 43 concurrency
Fayette		42.10	67.75	US 43 south / SR 13 – Eldridge, Tuscaloosa	Eastern end of US 43 concurrency
Walker		61.59	99.12	SR 69 – Jasper, Cullman, Tuscaloosa	Eastern terminus
1.000 mi = 1.609 km; 1.000 km = 0.621 mi: Concurrency terminus
