= Crews, Alabama =

Unincorporated community in Alabama, US

- Unincorporated community
- Location within Alabama Location within the United States
- Coordinates: 33°54′47.38″N 88°04′50.11″W
- Country: United States
- State: Alabama
- County: Lamar
- Elevation: 338 ft (103 m)
- Time zone: UTC-6 (Central (CST))
  - Summer (DST): UTC-5 (CDT)
- Area codes: 205, 659
- GNIS feature ID: 123100

Crews (also known as Crews Depot) is an unincorporated community in Lamar County, Alabama, United States, located on U.S. Route 278 between Sulligent and Beaverton.

== History ==
The Crews Normal College, which opened in 1891, was located in Crews.

Crews was once home to a boardinghouse, general store, and fruit canning factory.

A post office operated under the name Crews Depot from 1888 to 1950 and under the name Crews from 1950 to 1954.
