= Luxapallila Creek =

Coordinates: 33°46′5.12″N 87°51′37.95″W

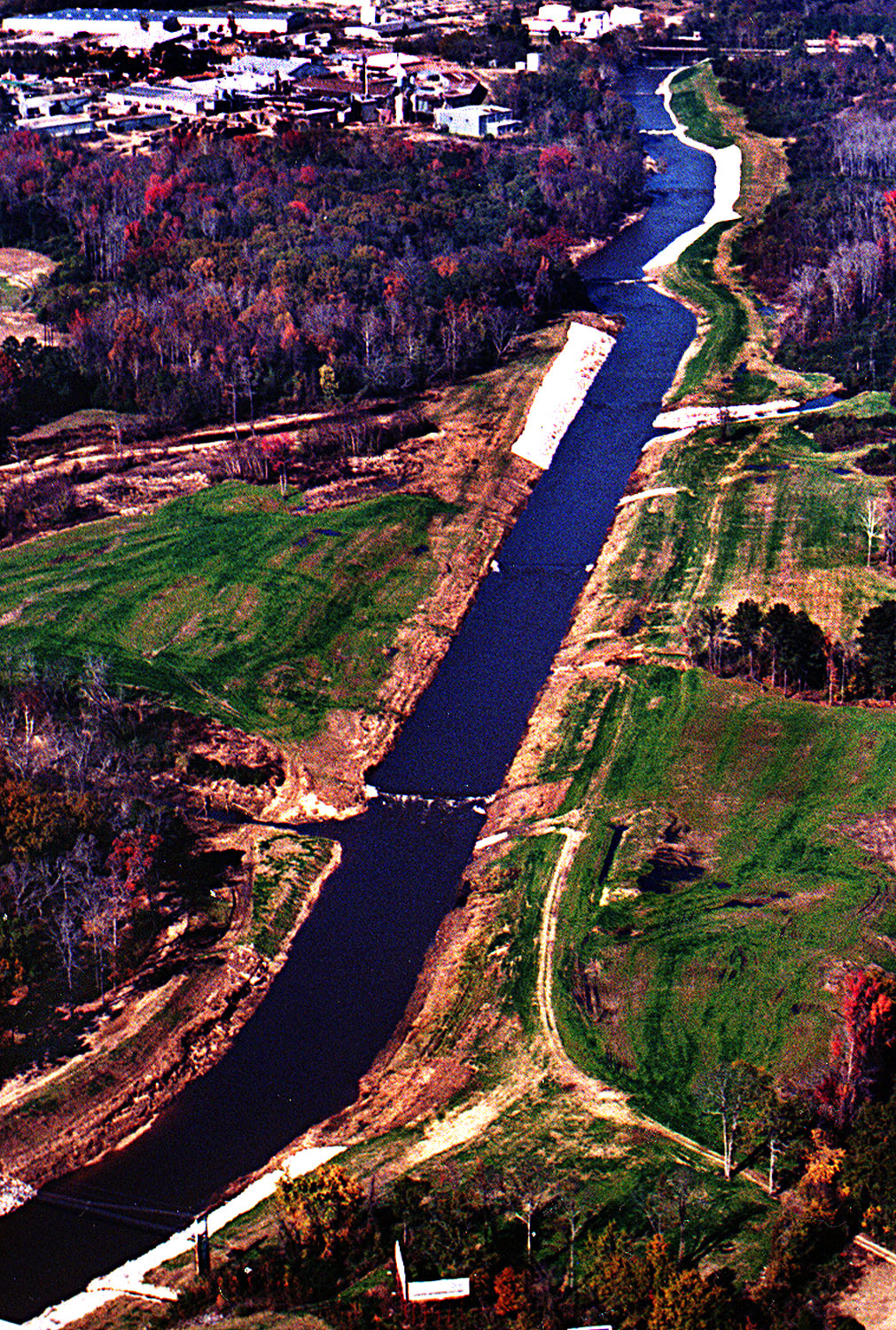
Aerial view of the Luxapalila Creek running through the center of Columbus, Mississippi, U.S.

Luxapalila Creek (also spelled Luxapallila Creek) is a 73.6-mile-long (118.4 km) stream in Mississippi and Alabama in the United States. Luxapalila means "flying turtle" in the Choctaw language.

The creek drains a watershed of 803 square miles (2,080 km^{2}) and flows through Lamar County, Marion County, Fayette County and Pickens County in Alabama and Monroe County and Lowndes County in Mississippi. It runs through the Alabama cities of Winfield, Millport, Kennedy, Fayette, and Columbus, Mississippi.

Its tributaries are Cut Bank Creek, Hell's Creek, Magby Creek, Mud Creek, Wilson Creek, and Yellow Creek.

== See also ==
- List of rivers of Alabama
- List of rivers of Mississippi
