= Fernbank, Alabama =

Unincorporated community in Alabama, US

- Unincorporated community
- Location within Alabama Location within the United States
- Coordinates: 33°34′45.4″N 88°08′30.1″W
- Country: United States
- State: Alabama
- County: Lamar
- Elevation: 256 ft (78 m)
- Time zone: UTC-6 (Central (CST))
  - Summer (DST): UTC-5 (CDT)
- Area codes: 205, 659
- GNIS feature ID: 118260

Fernbank is an unincorporated community in Lamar County, Alabama, United States, on the north bank of Luxapallila Creek. Fernbank is located approximately five miles northwest of Millport.

== History ==
The community was originally named Baltimore in honor of Baltimore, Maryland. The name was later changed to Fernbank due to the ferns growing in the surrounding area. The community is located on the former Georgia Pacific Railway and was once home to a Masonic lodge, sawmill, and drugstore.

A post office operated under the name Fernbank from 1884 to 1986.
