= Bluff, Alabama =

Unincorporated community in Alabama, United States

- Unincorporated community
- Location in Alabama
- Coordinates: 33°49′14″N 87°54′23″W
- Country: United States
- State: Alabama
- County: Fayette
- Elevation: 492 ft (150 m)
- Time zone: UTC-6 (Central (CST))
  - Summer (DST): UTC-5 (CDT)
- Area codes: 205, 659
- GNIS feature ID: 114604

Bluff is an unincorporated community in Fayette County, Alabama, United States. Bluff is located on Alabama State Route 107, 10.1 miles (16.3 km) north-northwest of Fayette.

== History ==
The community is named after a nearby ridge. A post office operated under the name Bluff from 1897 to 1905.
