= Darryl Wilson =

American basketball player

Personal information
- Born: May 29, 1974 (age 52) Alabama, United States
- Listed height: 6 ft 1 in (1.85 m)
- Listed weight: 185 lb (84 kg)

Career information
- High school: South Lamar (Kennedy, Alabama)
- College: Mississippi State (1993–1996)
- NBA draft: 1996: undrafted
- Playing career: 1996–2009
- Position: Guard

Career history
- 1996: Florida Sharks
- 1996: Basket Livorno
- 1997–1998: Grindavík
- 1998–1999: Virtus Ragusa
- 1999–2000: Belgrano S. Nicolás
- 2000–2001: Memphis Houn'Dawgs
- 2001–2002: Virtus Ragusa
- 2002–2003: Maccabi Rishon LeZion
- 2003–2004: Robur Osimo
- 2004–2006: Scafati 1969
- 2006: Mersin BŞB
- 2007: Ironi Ramat Gan
- 2007–2008: Montecatini Terme
- 2008: Scafati 1969
- 2009: Tupelo R-n-Rollers
- 2010: Birmingham Gladiators

Career highlights
- Icelandic Basketball Cup winner (1998); Italian LNP Cup winner (2006); Úrvalsdeild scoring leader (1998); First-team All-SEC (1996); Alabama Mr. Basketball (1992)

Darryl Wilson (born May 29, 1974) is an American former basketball player. He played college basketball for Mississippi State before going on to play several seasons professionally, including in the Lega Basket Serie A and the Israeli Basketball Premier League.

== Playing career ==
=== High school career ===
Wilson played high school basketball for South Lamar High School in Kennedy, Alabama, where he averaged 37.8 points a game as a senior.

=== College career ===
After graduating from South Lamar, Wilson joined the Mississippi State Bulldogs in 1992 but had to sit out his first season to meet NCAA academic eligibility requirements. He was an All-SEC guard during each of his three seasons with the Bulldogs, including a first team selection in 1996. He twice made the National Association of Basketball Coaches All-District team. During his senior year, the team made it all the way to the NCAA Final Four.

=== Professional career ===
Wilson started his professional career with the Florida Sharks who drafted him with the 11th pick overall in the 1996 USBL draft. He was released by the Sharks in end of May the same year.

In 1997, Wilson signed with Grindavík of the Icelandic Úrvalsdeild karla. During the second game of the regular season, he scored a season high 53 points. He helped the team win the Icelandic Basketball Cup after beating KFÍ in front of a record crowd in Laugardalshöll in the Cup finals, scoring 37 points. He was however fired from the team with 4 games left of the regular season due to repetitive disciplinary issues. Despite this, he led the league in scoring, avering 33.3 points per game.

Wilson retired from playing in 2009.
