= Rube Burrow =

American train-robber and outlaw

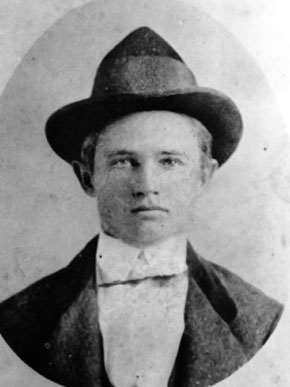
- Born: Reuben Houston Burrow; December 11, 1855; Lamar County, Alabama
- Died: October 9, 1890 (aged 34); Linden, Alabama
- Cause of death: Bullet wound
- Allegiance: Burrow Gang
- Criminal charges: Robbery
- Accomplice: Jim Burrow

Reuben Houston Burrow (December 11, 1855 – October 9, 1890) was a train-robber and outlaw in the Southern and Southwestern United States. During the final years of the American frontier, he became one of the most infamous and hunted men in the Old West since Jesse James. From 1886 to 1890, he and his gang robbed express trains in Alabama, Arkansas, Louisiana, the Indian Territory and Texas while pursued by hundreds of lawmen throughout the southern half of the United States, including the Pinkerton National Detective Agency.

== Biography ==
=== Early life ===
Born in Lamar County, Alabama on December 11, 1855, Rube Burrow worked on the family farm in Alabama until the age of 18 when he moved to Stephenville, Texas to work on his uncle's ranch. By all accounts, Burrow fully intended to become a rancher by saving up enough money to buy a farm, marry and start a family. He attempted farming but his wife, Virginia Catherine Alverson Burrow, died of yellow fever in 1881, leaving him to care for two small children. He remarried in 1884 and moved to Alexander, Texas, but when his crops failed he turned to robbing trains with his brother Jim in 1886.

His unexpected turn to crime occurred on December 11, 1886 when he and his brother Jim teamed with W.L Brock, Leonard Brock, Henderson Brumley, and Nep Thornton to rob the Denver & Fort Worth Express while returning from a trip to the Indian Territory. Burrow and the other men waited at the train depot at Bellevue, Texas until the train arrived. Drawing their guns at the crew, in full view of the passengers, they entered the train, but were only able to collect $300 (the Fort Worth Daily Gazette reported the loss of $100 and ten to fifteen watches) as the passengers were able to hide most of their valuables by the time the outlaws passed through. In one of the cars, a U.S. Army sergeant of 24th Infantry Regiment (United States) and two privates were escorting two deserters in shackles. The passengers were able to persuade the sergeant not to fire at the outlaws, however he was later censured for cowardice by his superiors following. Meanwhile, Burrow had already begun planning his next holdup.

=== From Texas to Arkansas ===
Six months after their first robbery, Burrow and his gang boarded the Texas & Pacific Express heading eastbound from Benbrook, Texas June 9, 1887. Learning from their mistakes from the last holdup, Burrows had the engineer held at gunpoint and forced him to stop the train on a trestle outside the town. This was meant to discourage passengers, who would have to "brave the heights and meager footing" in order to interfere with the robbery. The loot was $1,350.00; from the mail car 3 registered letters were taken. Although how much Burrow escaped with is not known, it was apparently enough for Burrows to rob a second train at the same spot on September 20, 1887. On the second occasion, news reports estimated Burrows and his gang escaped anywhere from $1,200 to between $12,000 and $30,000.

On December 9, he and Jim Brock stopped the St. Louis, Arkansas & Texas Railroad express train at Genoa, Arkansas. Despite the train being guarded by the Southern Express Company, the two men escaped with a Louisiana lottery payoff estimated to be between $10,000 and $40,000. Because the Southern Express Company was a client of the Pinkerton Detective Agency, the robbery came to the attention of Pinkerton detectives, lawmen and bounty hunters alike. Within five days, Pinkerton men came up with their first major lead. A deputy sheriff had reported that he had encountered three suspicious looking men on the day of the robbery. All three escaped, however one of the men left behind a raincoat which was eventually traced to a store in Dublin, Texas. The sales clerk identified the man who bought the coat as Jim Brock. Once in custody, Brock quickly confessed to participating in the robbery and named Burrow as the ringleader.

Burrow was unknown to authorities, having no criminal record, and Brock insisted he did not know the whereabouts of his accomplice. The Pinkertons would get their second break when Brock received a letter from the outlaw leader. Burrow was not yet aware of Brock's arrest and detectives seized the opportunity to capture him. According to the return address, the letter was sent from Lamar County, Alabama and a posse was immediately sent to his homestead. Upon their arrival on January 8, 1888, they surrounded his home but found that Burrow had fled after being warned by his brother Jim at their approach.

=== On the run ===
Two weeks after making their escape, Rube and Jim Burrow were spotted by a conductor while riding on a Louisville & Nashville train in southern Alabama. Police surrounded the train when it arrived in Montgomery (or Nashville, Tennessee) and captured Jim after a brief gunfight. Rube Burrow was able to shoot his way out and escaped from the ambush alone. It was reported a printer named Neb Broy who attempted to pursue Rube received a bullet hole in the chest; during his escape Rube was involved in a second gunfight with a posse but escaped despite receiving birdshot wound in the neck. Jim was taken into custody and sent to jail in Texarkana where he would die from tuberculosis on October 5, 1888. On December 15, 1888, Burrow and S.C. Brock, aka Joe Jackson, robbed an Illinois Central express train at Duck Hill, Mississippi; when the conductor reported the robbery in progress, two passengers-Chester Hughes with a Winchester rifle and John Wilkenson with a revolver-rushed to the express car where Burrow was. In his posthumous confession, Burrow claimed to have killed Hughes, who in falling knocked the pistol out of Wilkinson's hand.

Although Burrow was usually a cautious and detailed planner, he began to develop a reckless attitude which was further encouraged by his recent series of near escapes. Shortly after the gunfight at Montgomery, Burrow shot and killed Lamar County Postmaster Mose Graves in July 1889 during a heated argument when Graves demanded that Burrows sign for delivery of a package. The uncharacteristically cold-blooded murder of the postmaster turned the local residents against him and forced him to flee the county. Ironically, the package had contained a false beard Burrow had ordered to disguise himself.

Burrow continued to rob trains despite being a wanted fugitive. In September of that year, he robbed the Mobile & Ohio express train near Buckatunna, Mississippi, and then the Northwestern Railroad train in Louisiana two months later. He was pursued by Pinkerton detectives following the robbery for two days across the Raccoon Mountains in Blount County, Alabama. The posse was forced to turn back after two trackers, [one of them William Penn Woodard; the other Harry Annerton], had been killed and three others seriously wounded.

=== Death ===
Becoming the sole subject of one of the most widespread manhunts in American history, Burrow would continue to elude authorities in the wilderness of Alabama hill country for another two years. On October 9, 1890, Rube Burrow was captured by Jesse Hildreth and Frank Marshall, with the help of two planters, John McDuffie and Jeff "Dixie" Carter, at George Ford’s cabin in Myrtlewood, Marengo County, Alabama. McDuffie had suspected Burrow would be in the area and warned Hildreth to be on the lookout. When Burrow showed up at Ford's cabin, Hildreth was inside and was able to get word back to McDuffie. Hildreth and Marshall jumped Burrow and held him for McDuffie and Carter. They took him to the jail in Linden, Alabama, with Burrow entertaining them all the way with funny stories. Rube offered Hildreth a hundred dollars if he would let him go. Hildreth said "I couldn't use it then, cause you'd kill me first".

In the early morning of December 9, 1890, Burrow complained of hunger and talked his jailers into handing him his bag, which had some ginger snaps inside. It also contained a gun, and Burrow held it at the head of one of the guards. He escaped, locking two guards (including McDuffie) in his cell, and taking another guard with him to find Carter at Glass's store to get back money that had been taken from him. Burrow reportedly believed Dixie Carter was Nick Carter, the fictional detective. Carter was in the store, and when he came outside, he and Burrow exchanged gunfire. Afterwards, Burrow was dead in the street and Carter was wounded.

Burrow’s body was shipped by train back to Lamar County. It was reported that on a stop in Birmingham, thousands viewed the corpse and people snatched buttons from his coat, cut hair from his head, and even his boots were stolen. Burrow's father Allen Burrow met the train in Sulligent. It was reported that the train attendants threw the coffin at his feet. "It is Rube," he reportedly said. Allen Burrow carried his son's body back to his home community near Vernon and buried him in Fellowship Cemetery.

In December 1890, accomplice Jackson committed suicide in the Jackson Penitentiary by jumping from his gallery. Accomplice Rube Smith was sentenced to 10 years in the Mississippi Penitentiary for the 1889 Buckatunna robbery, but was then tried again in Federal court for mail robbery, found guilty and sentenced to life imprisonment in the Ohio Penitentiary in January 1891 as inmate #21,849 and died April 20, 1895.

Paul Picerni played Burrow in a 1955 episode of the syndicated television series Stories of the Century, starring and narrated by Jim Davis.
