= Daniel Grove =

Colorado state legislator

Member of the Colorado House of Representatives
- In office 1965–1968

Personal details
- Born: December 14, 1923
- Died: September 13, 1999 (aged 75)
- Party: Democratic
- Spouse: Mary E. Hyche (m. 1940)
- Children: 4
- Parent(s): Elbert V. Grove; Mary M. Grove
- Profession: Politician, probation counselor

Military service
- Allegiance: United States
- Branch/service: United States Army

Daniel Grove (December 14, 1923 – September 13, 1999) was a United States Army veteran, probation counselor, public official, and state representative in Colorado. He was a Democrat.

He served as probation officer for Denver's juvenile court. The Denver Public Library has a collection of his papers.

Grove was the eighth of ten children, born to Elbert V. and Mary M. Grove. His father was a blacksmith in Millport, Alabama. His family moved to Tuscaloosa, Alabama when he was a toddler, and he studied at Tuscaloosa County Training School and the Industrial High School in Tuscaloosa before dropping out in 1940 to join the Army. He married Mary E. Hyche on November 7, 1940, at the age of 17. They had four boys.

He served in the Colorado House of Representatives from 1965 to 1968.
