= South Lamar School =

Location
- 300 Sls Rd, Millport, Alabama 35576; Lamar County, Alabama; 33.5626°N 88.0369°W

Information
- School type: Unit
- Motto: EXPECTATIONS + EFFORT = EXCELLENCE
- Established: 1986
- School district: Lamar County School District
- Principal: Josh Harper
- Colors: Crimson, gold
- Mascot: Stallion
- Accreditation: SACS/CASI
- Website: lamarcountyk12.com/en-US/south-lamar-3bfd7667

South Lamar School is a public K-12 high school located in Millport, Alabama. It is a part of the Lamar County School District.

The principal is Josh Harper. South Lamar School's mascot is a Stallion. The school's colors are crimson and gold. It is a small, 1A school with around 630 students. In 2018, it received a financial reward from the state for having its third-graders test among the best in the state. According to Niche.com, during the 2025–2026 school year, South Lamar School's student population was 86.7% White, 6.9% African American, 4.6% multiracial, 1.4% Hispanic, and 0.3% Asian with a total minority enrollment of about 13%. South Lamar School is also ranked #58 out of 376 best high schools in Alabama, #59 out of 392 best middle schools in Alabama, and #125 out of 721 best elementary schools in Alabama. It is also ranked as #16 out of 65 for best k-12 schools in Alabama, as well as, #291 of 1,847 k-12 schools in America.

In 1992, the school's basketball team won a state championship. The school's basketball court was dedicated in the coach of that team's honor, Johnnie Wilson. He coached at the school for 32 years.

South Lamar School’s varsity softball team achieved a notable victory by winning the Class 1A Area Tournament final, defeating Berry High School 13–3, which secured their advancement to the AHSAA Regional Tournament.

== Mission ==
The school’s mission aims to foster lifelong learning, self‑respect, community pride, and responsible citizenship. Administrators, teachers, and parents collaborate to support students academically, emotionally, socially, physically, and aesthetically within a positive and safe environment.

== History ==
Founded in 1986, South Lamar School in Lamar County, Alabama, sits between Millport and Kennedy. It was formed from the merger of Millport and Kennedy schools, with the Class of 1987 becoming its first graduates. The school’s crimson and gold colors were chosen to honor the rival schools’ traditions—Millport’s crimson and Kennedy’s gold.

Initially, the merger sparked tension as fans and students from both towns adjusted to new traditions. Over time, unity grew, and the community proudly rallied behind their new identity as the Stallions. South Lamar’s campus serves K-12 and has a strong reputation for academics and athletics, despite enrollment drops caused by economic shifts. Smaller class sizes have allowed teachers to build strong connections with students, helping them thrive.

== Academics ==
The school is accredited by SACS/CASI and is ranked among the top third of Alabama schools. It has received recognition for high academic performance, including a state financial award in 2018 for outstanding 3rd-grade test scores.

- Math proficiency: 55% (top 20% in Alabama)
- Reading proficiency: 58% (top 50%)
- Science proficiency: ~32% (slightly below state average)
- Graduation rate: 80–89%
- ACT average: 23
- Niche rating: A− overall

== Extracurricular Activities ==
=== Athletics ===
South Lamar is classified as a Class 1A school and offers a variety of sports, including:

- Football
- Basketball
- Baseball
- Softball
- Volleyball
- Track and field
- Cheerleading

The boys' basketball team won a state championship in 1992, and the basketball court was named in honor of Coach Johnnie Wilson, who served for 32 years. In recent years, the varsity softball team won the Class 1A Area Tournament, advancing to regionals after defeating Berry High School.

=== Music & Arts ===
- South Lamar Marching Stallions Band: Active music program under the district’s clubs & organizations. Band achievements noted by students include “best in class” awards at competitions.

=== Clubs and Honor Societies ===
- Student Government Association (SGA)
- National Honor Society (NHS)
- Beta Club
- Scholar’s Bowl
- Upward Bound
- Educational Talent Search
- Leadership Team
- Executive Leadership Board

== Community and Culture ==
South Lamar plays a vital role in the local communities of Millport and Kennedy. School events, especially football games and pep rallies, serve as important social gatherings. The school promotes unity and pride under the shared identity: "We Are South Lamar!"

== Alumni ==
- Darryl Wilson, collegiate and professional basketball player

== See also ==
- List of high schools in Alabama
