= James Greer Bankhead House =

Historic house in Alabama, United States

- U.S. National Register of Historic Places
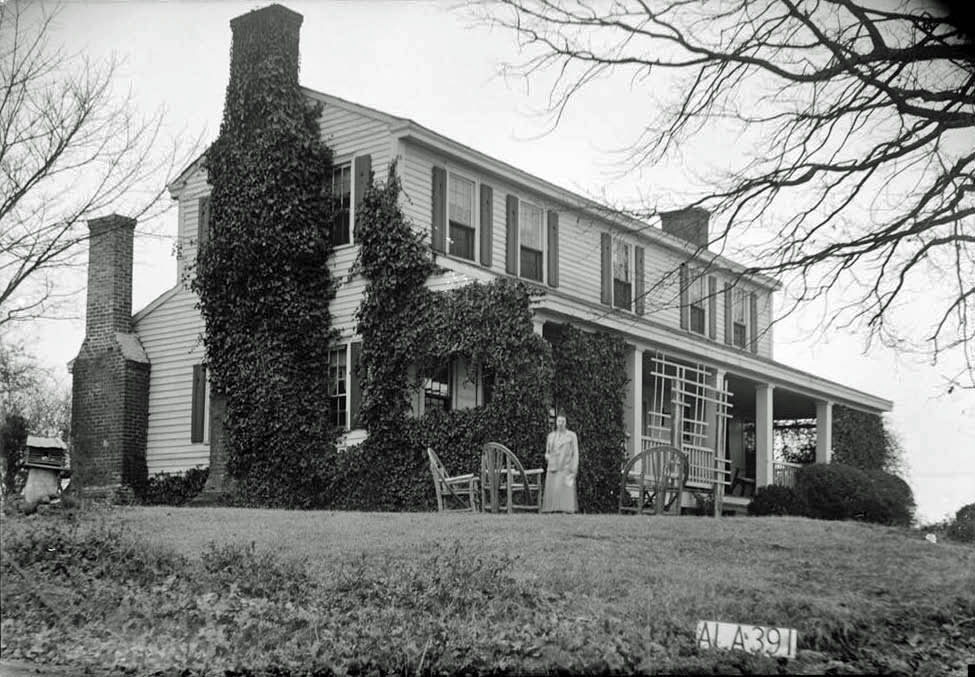
- As recorded by the Historic American Buildings Survey in 1936

- Location within Alabama Location within the United States
- Location: Wolf Rd., Sulligent, Alabama
- Coordinates: 33°54′17″N 88°7′18″W
- Area: less than one acre
- Built: 1850
- NRHP reference No.: 75000316
- Added to NRHP: February 13, 1975

The James Greer Bankhead House, also known simply as the Greer Bankhead House and Forest Home, is a historic house in Sulligent, Alabama. It was added to the National Register of Historic Places on February 13, 1975. It is the only site listed on the National Register in Lamar County.

== History ==
The Bankhead family came to Lamar County in 1818 from Union County, South Carolina. The Greer Bankhead House was built circa 1850 by James Greer Bankhead, a veteran of the Mexican–American War. James Greer's son, John H. Bankhead, was born at the Bankhead plantation on September 13, 1842, prior to the construction of this house. He would eventually serve in the United States Congress for 33 years. His sons, William B. Bankhead and John H. Bankhead II, were born in the house and both served in Congress as well. John H. Bankhead's granddaughter, the daughter of William B. Bankhead, was the award-winning American actress, Tallulah Bankhead.

The Greer Bankhead House was added to Alabama's Places in Peril, a list of the most endangered historic sites within the state, in 2010. It was noted to be in danger due to deferred maintenance and vandalism at that time. Since being listed, the Greer Bankhead Preservation and Restoration Project has spearheaded an effort to protect the house from vandalism and is raising funds to stabilize and restore the historic structure. The Greer Bankhead Preservation and Restoration Project had its proposal to deed the house to the Lamar County Historical Society rejected by the house's owner, John Bagwell. Recently the house was savagely attacked by vandals who destroyed many of the house's original windows. The Greer Bankhead Preservation and Restoration Project's Facebook page remains active in the hope that this historic property can still be saved.

== Architecture ==
The house was built as a dogtrot house, with an open breezeway on the ground floor, but it was later enclosed. The house now takes the form of an I-house, a house-type also known in the South as Plantation Plain. It has a two-story, gable roofed main portion and one-story, shed roofed portions on the front and rear. There are two large chimneys in each gable end, which taper at the base of the pediment. A similar, smaller chimney sits on the northern side of the rear shed roof portion; a similar chimney on the south side was knocked over in a 1933 tornado. The shed roofed front porch is supported by six square columns. Windows on the main block are all nine-over-six sashes, while there are four-over-four windows on the rear portion. On each floor, the main block has two rooms on either side of a central stair hall. The rear portion is split into three rooms. A kitchen and dining room were in a wing on the south portion of the house, but were also destroyed in the 1933 tornado.
