= Alabama State Route 142 =

State highway in Alabama, United States

State Route 142

Route information
- Maintained by ALDOT
- Length: 1.802 mi (2.900 km)
- Existed: 1982–present

Major junctions
- West end: US 278 southwest of Guin
- East end: US 43 / US 278 / SR 171 in Guin

Location
- Country: United States
- State: Alabama
- Counties: Marion

Highway system
- Alabama State Highway System; Interstate; US; State
← SR 141	→ SR 143

State Route 142 (SR 142) is a 1.802-mile-long (2.900 km) state highway in Marion County in the northwestern part of the U.S. state of Alabama. The western terminus of the highway is at an intersection with U.S. Route 278 (US 278) southwest of Guin. The eastern terminus of the highway is at an intersection with US 43/US 278 in Guin.

== Route description ==
SR 142 begins at an intersection with US 278 (internally designated as SR 118) southwest of Guin. It heads northeast through forested areas, on two-lane undivided 11th Avenue. The highway enters the city limits of Guin at a crossing over Wickett Creek. It crosses over a BNSF Railway line and Purgatory Creek. The route turns more to the east as it begins to pass homes and businesses. It intersects the eastern terminus of Marion County Route 16 (CR 16). SR 142 continues east into the commercial downtown of Guin, ending at an intersection with US 43/US 278/SR 118/SR 171.

== History ==
SR 142 was created in 1982 when US 278 was rerouted along a new roadway south of Guin.

== Major intersections ==
The entire route is in Marion County.

Location	mi	km	Destinations	Notes
	0.000	0.000	US 278 (SR 118) – Sulligent, Guin	Western terminus
Guin	1.802	2.900	US 43 north / US 278 east / SR 171 north to I-22 – Hamilton US 43 south / SR 118 east / SR 171 south (11th Avenue E) – Winfield, Jasper US 278 west (SR 118 west/SR 107 south) – Sulligent, Fayette	Eastern terminus; northern terminus of SR 107
1.000 mi = 1.609 km; 1.000 km = 0.621 mi
