= Alabama State Route 107 =

State highway in Alabama, United States

State Route 107

Route information
- Maintained by ALDOT
- Length: 19.105 mi (30.747 km)
- Existed: 1957–present

Major junctions
- South end: SR 18 west of Fayette
- North end: US 43 / US 278 / SR 118 / SR 142 / SR 171 in Guin

Location
- Country: United States
- State: Alabama
- Counties: Fayette, Marion

Highway system
- Alabama State Highway System; Interstate; US; State
← SR 106	→ SR 108

State Route 107 (SR 107) is a 19.105-mile-long (30.747 km) state highway in the western part of the U.S. state of Alabama. The southern terminus of the route is at an intersection with SR 18 approximately 3 miles (4.8 km) northwest of Fayette. The highway reaches its northern terminus about 2 miles (3.2 km) south of Guin at an intersection with SR 118.

== Route description ==
SR 107 is aligned on a two-lane road as it travels through Fayette and Marion counties. It is a parallel route to U.S. Route 43 (US 43), aligned west of the U.S. Highway. The route serves to connect the towns at its southern and northern termini and does not pass through any incorporated cities or towns.

== Major intersections ==
County	Location	mi	km	Destinations	Notes
Fayette		0.000	0.000	SR 18 – Vernon, Fayette	Southern terminus
Marion	Guin	18.823	30.293	US 278 west (SR 118 west) – Beaverton, Sulligent	Southern end of US 278/SR 118 concurrency
Marion	Guin	19.105	30.747	US 43 north / US 278 east / SR 171 north to I-22 – Hamilton SR 142 west (11th Avenue W) US 43 south / SR 118 east / SR 171 south (11th Avenue E) – Winfield	Northern terminus; northern end of US 278/SR 118 concurrency; eastern terminus of SR 142
1.000 mi = 1.609 km; 1.000 km = 0.621 mi: Concurrency terminus
