= Jones County, Alabama =

Jones County, Alabama may refer to two former counties in the US state of Alabama:

- Covington County, Alabama. Renamed Jones County on August 6, 1868, the original name of Covington was restored two months later on October 10, 1868.
- Lamar County, Alabama. Established as Jones County on February 4, 1867, re-established as Sanford County on October 8, 1868, and renamed Lamar County on February 8, 1877.
