= 1984 United States presidential election in Alabama =

- November 6, 1984

Nominee	Ronald Reagan	Walter Mondale
Party	Republican	Democratic
Home state	California	Minnesota
Running mate	George H. W. Bush	Geraldine Ferraro
Electoral vote	9	0
Popular vote	872,849	551,899
Percentage	60.54%	38.28%
County results
Reagan
40–50%
50–60%
60–70%
70–80%
Mondale
50–60%
60–70%
70–80%
80–90%
President before election
Ronald Reagan
Republican
Elected President
Ronald Reagan
Republican

The 1984 United States presidential election in Alabama took place on November 6, 1984. All 50 states and the District of Columbia were part of the 1984 United States presidential election. Alabama voters chose 9 electors to the Electoral College, which selected the president and vice president of the United States.

Alabama was won by incumbent United States President Ronald Reagan of California, who was running against former Vice President Walter Mondale of Minnesota. Reagan ran for a second time with former C.I.A. Director George H. W. Bush of Texas, and Mondale ran with Representative Geraldine Ferraro of New York, the first major female candidate for the vice presidency.

Every county in the state gave either Reagan or Mondale a majority save Etowah County, which gave Reagan a plurality. Macon County gave Mondale 82.71% of the vote, which was the highest percentage he received in any county nationwide outside the District of Columbia.

Reagan easily carried Alabama on Election Day, winning the state by a 22-point margin, a dramatic shift from 1980, when Reagan had won it by just 1.3% over Southerner Jimmy Carter. This was only the third time that the Republican nominee exceeded 60% of the vote in Alabama, after Barry Goldwater in 1964 and Richard Nixon in 1972. Mondale carried most of Alabama's Black Belt counties, but outside these predominantly African-American counties, he carried only Colbert, Lawrence, and Jackson Counties, which lay within the region served by the Tennessee Valley Authority (Colbert is home to Muscle Shoals). Overwhelmingly, the state's 'Wallace country' went red this election, unlike in 1976 or even 1980. As an example, Reagan claimed over 2/3 of the vote in Coffee County, which had voted for Carter in 1976 by over 20% and had voted for Reagan in 1980 by just 4.7%.

== Campaign ==
Jesse Jackson's voters were 96% black, 2% white, 1% Hispanic, and 1% were members of other groups. 61% of Jackson voters listed Mondale as their second candidate in exit polls conducted by CBS News and The New York Times'.

Among white voters, 73% supported Reagan while 25% supported Mondale.

== Results ==
1984 United States presidential election in Alabama
Party	Candidate	Votes	Percentage	Electoral votes
Republican	Ronald Reagan (incumbent)	872,849	60.54%	9
Democratic	Walter Mondale	551,899	38.28%	0
Libertarian	David Bergland	9,504	0.66%	0
Independent	Gus Hall	4,671	0.32%	0
Independent	Bob Richards	1,401	0.10%	0
Independent	Melvin Mason	730	0.05%	0
Independent	Dennis Serrette	659	0.05%	0
Totals		1,441,713	100.00%	9

=== Results by county ===
County	Ronald Reagan Republican		Walter Mondale Democratic		David Bergland Libertarian		Gus Hall Independent		Various candidates Other parties		Margin		Total votes cast
County	#	%	#	%	#	%	#	%	#	%	#	%	Total votes cast
Autauga	8,350	70.07%	3,366	28.25%	165	1.38%	15	0.13%	21	0.18%	4,984	41.82%	11,917
Baldwin	24,964	75.55%	7,272	22.01%	337	1.02%	29	0.09%	443	1.34%	17,692	53.54%	33,045
Barbour	5,459	53.73%	4,591	45.18%	89	0.88%	7	0.07%	15	0.15%	868	8.55%	10,161
Bibb	3,487	61.32%	2,167	38.10%	13	0.23%	6	0.11%	14	0.25%	1,320	23.22%	5,687
Blount	8,508	68.16%	3,738	29.95%	102	0.82%	21	0.17%	113	0.91%	4,770	38.21%	12,482
Bullock	1,697	32.02%	3,537	66.75%	49	0.92%	4	0.08%	12	0.23%	-1,840	-34.73%	5,299
Butler	4,941	56.73%	3,641	41.81%	116	1.33%	5	0.06%	6	0.07%	1,300	14.92%	8,709
Calhoun	23,291	61.16%	12,752	33.49%	400	1.05%	1,143	3.00%	496	1.30%	10,539	27.67%	38,082
Chambers	8,024	59.60%	5,302	39.38%	113	0.84%	10	0.07%	14	0.10%	2,722	20.22%	13,463
Cherokee	3,225	51.04%	3,029	47.93%	55	0.87%	3	0.05%	7	0.11%	196	3.11%	6,319
Chilton	8,243	70.53%	2,934	25.10%	93	0.80%	388	3.32%	30	0.26%	5,309	45.43%	11,688
Choctaw	3,960	53.88%	3,373	45.90%	6	0.08%	3	0.04%	7	0.10%	587	7.98%	7,349
Clarke	6,282	58.11%	4,452	41.18%	67	0.62%	4	0.04%	6	0.06%	1,830	16.93%	10,811
Clay	3,432	68.19%	1,456	28.93%	70	1.39%	63	1.25%	12	0.24%	1,976	39.26%	5,033
Cleburne	3,259	70.50%	1,238	26.78%	43	0.93%	33	0.71%	50	1.08%	2,021	43.72%	4,623
Coffee	10,558	69.84%	4,370	28.91%	141	0.93%	10	0.07%	39	0.26%	6,188	40.93%	15,118
Colbert	9,530	45.31%	11,008	52.34%	231	1.10%	29	0.14%	234	1.11%	-1,478	-7.03%	21,032
Conecuh	3,538	55.86%	2,735	43.18%	36	0.57%	14	0.22%	11	0.17%	803	12.68%	6,334
Coosa	2,585	58.95%	1,781	40.62%	9	0.21%	7	0.16%	3	0.07%	804	18.33%	4,385
Covington	9,944	71.63%	3,812	27.46%	55	0.40%	45	0.32%	27	0.19%	6,132	44.17%	13,883
Crenshaw	3,261	61.86%	1,904	36.12%	32	0.61%	65	1.23%	10	0.19%	1,357	25.74%	5,272
Cullman	14,782	63.92%	7,989	34.55%	143	0.62%	176	0.76%	36	0.16%	6,793	29.37%	23,126
Dale	10,319	75.37%	3,215	23.48%	133	0.97%	8	0.06%	17	0.12%	7,104	51.89%	13,692
Dallas	9,585	46.26%	10,955	52.88%	151	0.73%	13	0.06%	14	0.07%	-1,370	-6.62%	20,718
DeKalb	12,098	62.53%	7,212	37.27%	19	0.10%	5	0.03%	15	0.08%	4,886	25.26%	19,349
Elmore	11,694	72.74%	4,198	26.11%	162	1.01%	7	0.04%	16	0.10%	7,496	46.63%	16,077
Escambia	8,694	68.33%	3,853	30.28%	70	0.55%	77	0.61%	30	0.24%	4,841	38.05%	12,724
Etowah	19,243	49.62%	19,074	49.18%	184	0.47%	252	0.65%	28	0.07%	169	0.44%	38,781
Fayette	4,654	64.63%	2,533	35.18%	9	0.12%	4	0.06%	1	0.01%	2,121	29.45%	7,201
Franklin	5,304	52.90%	4,601	45.89%	100	1.00%	8	0.08%	14	0.14%	703	7.01%	10,027
Geneva	6,308	70.00%	2,330	25.86%	80	0.89%	282	3.13%	11	0.12%	3,978	44.14%	9,011
Greene	1,361	26.13%	3,675	70.55%	51	0.98%	122	2.34%	0	0.00%	-2,314	-44.42%	5,209
Hale	2,691	44.44%	3,289	54.31%	60	0.99%	4	0.07%	12	0.20%	-598	-9.87%	6,056
Henry	3,952	63.34%	2,231	35.76%	17	0.27%	24	0.38%	15	0.24%	1,721	27.58%	6,239
Houston	20,854	75.82%	6,488	23.59%	56	0.20%	90	0.33%	17	0.06%	14,366	52.23%	27,505
Jackson	6,730	46.15%	7,635	52.36%	169	1.16%	15	0.10%	33	0.23%	-905	-6.21%	14,582
Jefferson	158,362	59.41%	107,506	40.33%	485	0.18%	72	0.03%	122	0.05%	50,856	19.08%	266,547
Lamar	3,943	67.21%	1,910	32.55%	4	0.07%	1	0.02%	9	0.15%	2,033	34.66%	5,867
Lauderdale	15,354	53.57%	12,907	45.04%	352	1.23%	23	0.08%	23	0.08%	2,447	8.53%	28,659
Lawrence	4,466	47.04%	4,866	51.25%	77	0.81%	71	0.75%	14	0.15%	-400	-4.21%	9,494
Lee	16,757	64.05%	9,077	34.70%	289	1.10%	17	0.06%	21	0.08%	7,680	29.35%	26,161
Limestone	8,423	60.12%	5,410	38.62%	160	1.14%	12	0.09%	5	0.04%	3,013	21.50%	14,010
Lowndes	1,629	31.02%	3,567	67.92%	38	0.72%	5	0.10%	13	0.25%	-1,938	-36.90%	5,252
Macon	1,543	16.24%	7,857	82.71%	52	0.55%	19	0.20%	28	0.29%	-6,314	-66.47%	9,499
Madison	50,428	64.54%	26,881	34.40%	683	0.87%	58	0.07%	84	0.11%	23,547	30.14%	78,134
Marengo	5,261	51.51%	4,811	47.11%	101	0.99%	8	0.08%	32	0.31%	450	4.40%	10,213
Marion	6,771	63.20%	3,918	36.57%	17	0.16%	4	0.04%	3	0.03%	2,853	26.63%	10,713
Marshall	12,330	60.47%	7,704	37.78%	305	1.50%	32	0.16%	20	0.10%	4,626	22.69%	20,391
Mobile	81,923	62.56%	47,252	36.08%	804	0.61%	772	0.59%	208	0.16%	34,671	26.48%	130,959
Monroe	5,917	60.65%	3,725	38.18%	55	0.56%	40	0.41%	19	0.19%	2,192	22.47%	9,756
Montgomery	43,328	57.77%	31,206	41.61%	337	0.45%	19	0.03%	115	0.15%	12,122	16.16%	75,005
Morgan	24,301	67.99%	11,324	31.68%	73	0.20%	12	0.03%	31	0.09%	12,977	36.31%	35,741
Perry	2,600	48.08%	2,731	50.50%	66	1.22%	5	0.09%	6	0.11%	-131	-2.42%	5,408
Pickens	4,685	56.47%	3,586	43.23%	9	0.11%	6	0.07%	10	0.12%	1,099	13.24%	8,296
Pike	6,231	62.60%	3,541	35.58%	146	1.47%	12	0.12%	23	0.23%	2,690	27.02%	9,953
Randolph	4,940	65.74%	2,439	32.46%	124	1.65%	6	0.08%	6	0.08%	2,501	33.28%	7,515
Russell	6,654	46.04%	7,610	52.66%	166	1.15%	6	0.04%	16	0.11%	-956	-6.62%	14,452
Shelby	21,858	77.88%	5,884	20.96%	271	0.97%	20	0.07%	6	0.02%	15,974	56.92%	28,068
St. Clair	10,408	71.02%	4,000	27.30%	232	1.58%	8	0.05%	35	0.24%	6,408	43.72%	14,654
Sumter	2,493	35.65%	4,478	64.04%	16	0.23%	1	0.01%	5	0.07%	-1,985	-28.39%	6,993
Talladega	14,067	61.11%	8,490	36.88%	220	0.96%	209	0.91%	34	0.15%	5,577	24.23%	23,020
Tallapoosa	9,045	66.19%	4,458	32.62%	139	1.02%	11	0.08%	13	0.10%	4,587	33.57%	13,666
Tuscaloosa	28,075	62.75%	16,066	35.91%	533	1.19%	37	0.08%	28	0.06%	12,009	26.84%	44,739
Walker	12,852	54.11%	10,591	44.59%	94	0.40%	194	0.82%	22	0.09%	2,261	9.52%	23,753
Washington	4,434	58.78%	3,081	40.85%	17	0.23%	2	0.03%	9	0.12%	1,353	17.93%	7,543
Wilcox	2,337	38.81%	3,663	60.83%	8	0.13%	4	0.07%	10	0.17%	-1,326	-22.02%	6,022
Winston	6,845	72.22%	2,624	27.69%	5	0.05%	3	0.03%	1	0.01%	4,221	44.53%	9,478
Totals	872,849	60.54%	551,899	38.28%	9,504	0.66%	4,671	0.32%	2,790	0.19%	320,950	22.26%	1,441,713

==== Counties that flipped from Democratic to Republican ====
- Cherokee
- Chambers
- Choctaw
- Clarke
- Clay
- Conecuh
- Coosa
- Crenshaw
- Cullman
- Etowah
- Pickens
- Washington
- Walker
- Talladega
- Tallapoosa
- Morgan
- Randolph
- Limestone
- Marion
- Marengo
- Marshall
- Lauderdale
- Henry
- Lamar
- Bibb
- Barbour
- Butler
- Fayette
- Franklin

== See also ==
- Presidency of Ronald Reagan
- United States presidential elections in Alabama

== Works cited ==
- Black, Earl; Black, Merle (1992). The Vital South: How Presidents Are Elected. Harvard University Press. ISBN 0674941306.
- Ranney, Austin, ed. (1985). The American Elections of 1984. Duke University Press. ISBN 0822302306.
