= Boley Springs, Alabama =

Unincorporated community in Alabama, United States

- Unincorporated community
- Location in Alabama
- Coordinates: 33°38′35″N 87°30′36″W
- Country: United States
- State: Alabama
- County: Fayette
- Elevation: 722 ft (220 m)
- Time zone: UTC-6 (Central (CST))
  - Summer (DST): UTC-5 (CDT)
- Area codes: 205, 659
- GNIS feature ID: 114689

Boley Springs is an unincorporated community in Fayette County, Alabama, United States. A post office operated under the name Boley Springs from 1877 to 1887.

This community was involved with the tornadoes that hit the state on April 27, 2011.
