= Newtonville, Alabama =

Unincorporated community in Alabama, US

- Unincorporated community
- Location in Alabama
- Coordinates: 33°32′43″N 87°48′05″W
- Country: United States
- State: Alabama
- County: Fayette
- Elevation: 312 ft (95 m)
- Time zone: UTC-6 (Central (CST))
  - Summer (DST): UTC-5 (CDT)
- Area codes: 205, 659
- GNIS feature ID: 123935

Newtonville is an unincorporated community in Fayette County, Alabama, United States. Newtonville is located on Alabama State Route 171, 10.4 miles (16.7 km) south of Fayette.

== History ==
The community is named after E. B. Newton, an early settler of the area. A post office operated under the name Newtonville from 1850 to 1940.
