= Henson Springs, Alabama =

Unincorporated community in Alabama, US

- Unincorporated community
- Location within Alabama Location within the United States
- Coordinates: 34°01′09″N 88°03′51″W
- Country: United States
- State: Alabama
- County: Lamar
- Elevation: 354 ft (108 m)
- Time zone: UTC-6 (Central (CST))
  - Summer (DST): UTC-5 (CDT)
- Area codes: 205, 659
- GNIS feature ID: 158842

Henson Springs, also known as Cobb Town, Hansons Springs, or Webb, is an unincorporated community in Lamar County, Alabama, United States.

== History ==
Henson Springs, along with the previous community names of Cobb Town, and Webb, are all named for local families. A post office operated under the name Henson Springs from 1892 to 1893.
