= Studdards Crossroads, Alabama =

Unincorporated community in Alabama, United States

- Unincorporated community
- Location in Alabama
- Coordinates: 33°48′30″N 87°35′15″W
- Country: United States
- State: Alabama
- County: Fayette
- Elevation: 512 ft (156 m)
- Time zone: UTC-6 (Central (CST))
  - Summer (DST): UTC-5 (CDT)
- Area codes: 205, 659
- GNIS feature ID: 127482

Studdards Crossroads is an unincorporated community in Fayette County, Alabama, United States.

== History ==
The community is likely named after Andrew Studdard, who was given a grant to the surrounding land in 1860.
