= Belk, Alabama =

- Town
- Location of Belk in Fayette County, Alabama.
- Coordinates: 33°39′06″N 87°55′43″W
- Country: United States
- State: Alabama
- County: Fayette

Area
  - Total: 1.39 sq mi (3.59 km^{2})
  - Land: 1.39 sq mi (3.59 km^{2})
  - Water: 0 sq mi (0.00 km^{2})
- Elevation: 361 ft (110 m)

Population (2020)
  - Total: 186
  - Density: 134.2/sq mi (51.81/km^{2})
- Time zone: UTC-6 (Central (CST))
  - Summer (DST): UTC-5 (CDT)
- ZIP code: 35545
- Area codes: 205, 659
- FIPS code: 01-05164
- GNIS feature ID: 2405230

Belk is a town in Fayette County, Alabama, United States. Its citizens voted to incorporate in January 1969. At the 2020 census, the population was 186.

== Geography ==
Belk is located on the east side of the valley of Luxapalilla Creek, a southwest-flowing tributary of the Tombigbee River. Alabama State Route 96 runs through the town, leading northeast 7 miles (11 km) to Fayette, the county seat, and southwest 12 miles (19 km) to Millport. Columbus, Mississippi, is 34 miles (55 km) to the southwest.

According to the U.S. Census Bureau, Belk has a total area of 1.4 square miles (3.6 km^{2}), all land.

== Demographics ==
Historical population
Census	Pop.	Note	%±
1970	64		—
1980	308		381.3%
1990	255		−17.2%
2000	214		−16.1%
2010	215		0.5%
2020	186		−13.5%
U.S. Decennial Census; 2013 Estimate

As of the census of 2000, there were 214 people, 97 households, and 70 families residing in the town. The population density was 160.9 inhabitants per square mile (62.1/km^{2}). There were 111 housing units at an average density of 83.4 per square mile (32.2/km^{2}). The racial makeup of the town was 97.20% White, 0.93% Black or African American, 1.40% from other races, and 0.47% from two or more races. 1.40% of the population were Hispanic or Latino of any race.

There were 97 households, out of which 23.7% had children under the age of 18 living with them, 60.8% were married couples living together, 7.2% had a female householder with no husband present, and 27.8% were non-families. 26.8% of all households were made up of individuals, and 18.6% had someone living alone who was 65 years of age or older. The average household size was 2.21 and the average family size was 2.64.

In the town, the population was spread out, with 20.1% under the age of 18, 2.8% from 18 to 24, 25.2% from 25 to 44, 32.7% from 45 to 64, and 19.2% who were 65 years of age or older. The median age was 47 years. For every 100 females, there were 87.7 males. For every 100 females age 18 and over, there were 81.9 males.

The median income for a household in the town was $32,188, and the median income for a family was $43,333. Males had a median income of $30,313 versus $18,500 for females. The per capita income for the town was $16,848. About 2.8% of families and 6.3% of the population were below the poverty line, including 11.5% of those under the age of 18 and 10.7% of those 65 or over.

== Government ==
Ronald Waldrop was mayor until his death in 2020.

== See also ==
- List of cities and towns in Alabama
