= Howard, Alabama =

Unincorporated community in Alabama, United States

- Unincorporated community
- Location in Alabama
- Coordinates: 33°51′15″N 87°34′03″W
- Country: United States
- State: Alabama
- County: Fayette
- Elevation: 650 ft (200 m)
- Time zone: UTC-6 (Central (CST))
  - Summer (DST): UTC-5 (CDT)
- Area codes: 205, 659
- GNIS feature ID: 155108

Howard, also known as Howard Mines or Stovalls Gap, is an unincorporated community in Fayette County, Alabama, United States.

== History ==
The community is possibly named after the original owner of the surrounding land or for the head of the local coal-mining operation. A post office operated under the name Stovalls Gap from 1926 to 1927 and under the name Howard from 1927 to 1942. Moss & McCormack, a coal company based in Birmingham, leased the area in 1923 to open a coal mine. A miner from Kansas, Alabama died in a mining accident at the Howard Mine in 1935.
