= Hightogy, Alabama =

Unincorporated community in Alabama, United States

- Unincorporated community
- Location within Alabama Location within the United States
- Coordinates: 33°41′42″N 88°05′41″W
- Country: United States
- State: Alabama
- County: Lamar
- Elevation: 476 ft (145 m)
- Time zone: UTC-6 (Central (CST))
  - Summer (DST): UTC-5 (CDT)
- Area codes: 205, 659
- GNIS feature ID: 157983

Hightogy, also known as Ridge Beat or Simmon Town, is an unincorporated community in Lamar County, Alabama, United States. Hightogy is located along Alabama State Route 17, 4.8 miles (7.7 km) south-southeast of Vernon.

== History ==
The community's name is possibly a compound word derived from high and the Middle English word tor, which means "high, craggy hill". A post office operated under the name Hightogy from 1890 to 1909.
