= Covin, Alabama =

Unincorporated community in Alabama, United States

- Unincorporated community
- Location in Alabama
- Coordinates: 33°41′24″N 87°53′21″W
- Country: United States
- State: Alabama
- County: Fayette
- Elevation: 335 ft (102 m)
- Time zone: UTC-6 (Central (CST))
  - Summer (DST): UTC-5 (CDT)
- Area codes: 205, 659
- GNIS feature ID: 116746

Covin, also known as Brockton or Tallula, is an unincorporated community in Fayette County, Alabama, United States.

== History ==
The community was originally named Brockton after the first postmaster, Reuben J. Brock. The name was then changed to Tallula, possibly after Tallulah, Louisiana. Finally, the name was changed to Covin in honor of L. E. Covin, who donated the land for the railroad depot. Covin was located on the Southern Railway. Two logging companies, Coosa Lumber Company and Covin Lumber Company, operated railways in the immediate area. A saw mill, planing mill, and dry kiln also operated in Covin. At one point, there were three grist mills in operation in Covin. A post office operated under the name Brockton from 1884 to 1890, under the name Tallula from 1890 to 1892, and under the name Covin from 1892 to 1958.

The Shackelford family was an African-American family who lived in Covin. The family was known for their service as photographers, and a considerable amount of their photographs have survived. They also operated a general store, saw mill, and syrup mill in Covin, and assisted in opening a school and Baptist church. A collection of their photographs have been displayed at the Birmingham Public Library, the History Museum of Mobile, and the Rosa Parks Museum.
