= 1980 United States presidential election in Alabama =

- November 4, 1980

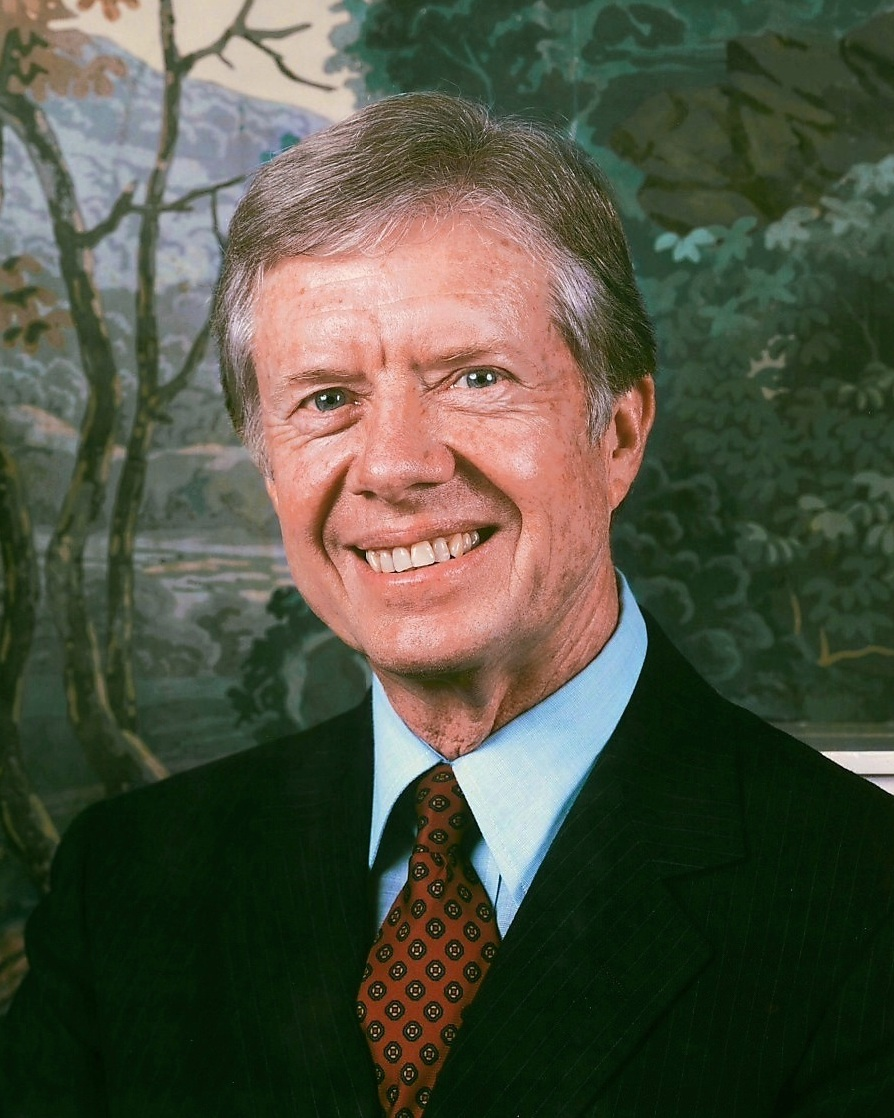
Nominee	Ronald Reagan	Jimmy Carter
Party	Republican	Democratic
Home state	California	Georgia
Running mate	George H. W. Bush	Walter Mondale
Electoral vote	9	0
Popular vote	654,192	636,730
Percentage	48.75%	47.45%

Reagan
40–50%
50–60%
60–70%
Carter
40–50%
50–60%
60–70%
70–80%
80–90%
President before election
Jimmy Carter
Democratic
Elected President
Ronald Reagan
Republican

The United States presidential election in Alabama was held on November 4, 1980. Former California Governor Ronald Reagan narrowly won the state and its 9 electoral votes, winning 48.8% to incumbent President Jimmy Carter's 47.5%. John B. Anderson came in third place, winning 1.23%, although Alabama was Anderson's weakest state in the entire country. Two other candidates, Conservative Party nominee John Rarick and Libertarian Party candidate Ed Clark, each received close to one percent of the vote.

The key to Reagan’s narrow victory statewide, was his landslide victory in the ‘Over the Mountain’ suburbs of Birmingham. For example, The Locksley Fire Station precinct in Mountain Brook, voted for Reagan by landslide margin of 3,662 to 527 for Carter, this precinct alone nearly accounted for 20 percent of Reagan’s statewide margin. Reagan’s support from these areas contributed to Reagan winning Jefferson County (the state’s largest county), by a larger raw vote margin than he won the state by, in spite of easily losing to Carter in precincts the core of Birmingham.

As of the 2024 presidential election, this is the last election in which Limestone County, Morgan County, Marshall County, Talladega County, Cullman County, Tallapoosa County, Bibb County, Randolph County, Henry County, Lamar County, and Clay County voted for a Democratic presidential candidate. This is also the most recent election where Alabama was more Democratic than the nation at-large and where Alabama voted left of several modern-day blue and purple states like California, Connecticut, Illinois, New Jersey, New York, and Pennsylvania.

Among white voters, 59% supported Reagan while 36% supported Carter.

== Results ==
1980 United States presidential election in Alabama
Party	Candidate	Votes	%	±%
Republican	Ronald Reagan	654,192	48.75%	▲6.14
Democratic	Jimmy Carter	636,730	47.45%	▼8.28
Independent	John B. Anderson	16,481	1.23%	N/A
AL Conservative	John Rarick	15,010	1.12%	▲0.34
Libertarian	Ed Clark	13,318	0.99%	▲0.86
AL Statesman	Benjamin Bubar	1,743	0.13%	▼0.43
Communist	Gus Hall	1,629	0.12%	▼0.05
Socialist Workers	Clifton DeBerry	1,303	0.10%	N/A
Socialist	David McReynolds	1,006	0.07%	N/A
Citizens	Barry Commoner	517	0.04%	N/A
Total votes		1,341,929	100.00%	

=== Result by county ===
County	Ronald Reagan Republican		Jimmy Carter Democratic		John B. Anderson Independent		John Rarick Alabama Conservative		Ed Clark Libertarian		Various candidates Other parties		Margin		Total
County	#	%	#	%	#	%	#	%	#	%	#	%	#	%	Total
Autauga	6,292	56.87%	4,295	38.82%	125	1.13%	216	1.95%	119	1.08%	16	0.14%	1,997	18.05%	11,063
Baldwin	18,652	65.78%	8,448	29.80%	414	1.46%	272	0.96%	465	1.64%	102	0.36%	10,204	35.98%	28,353
Barbour	4,171	46.34%	4,458	49.53%	65	0.72%	202	2.24%	80	0.89%	25	0.28%	-287	-3.19%	9,001
Bibb	2,491	44.30%	3,097	55.08%	22	0.39%	5	0.09%	8	0.14%	0	0.00%	-606	-10.78%	5,623
Blount	6,819	53.59%	5,656	44.45%	75	0.59%	37	0.29%	92	0.72%	45	0.35%	1,163	9.14%	12,724
Bullock	1,446	25.65%	3,960	70.25%	29	0.51%	158	2.80%	33	0.59%	11	0.20%	-2,514	-44.60%	5,637
Butler	3,810	45.53%	4,156	49.67%	59	0.71%	205	2.45%	107	1.28%	31	0.37%	-346	-4.14%	8,368
Calhoun	17,475	49.17%	17,017	47.88%	433	1.22%	90	0.25%	286	0.80%	240	0.68%	458	1.29%	35,541
Chambers	4,864	40.88%	6,649	55.88%	122	1.03%	145	1.22%	96	0.81%	23	0.19%	-1,785	-15.00%	11,899
Cherokee	2,482	38.55%	3,764	58.47%	63	0.98%	51	0.79%	70	1.09%	8	0.12%	-1,282	-19.92%	6,438
Chilton	6,615	57.64%	4,706	41.00%	60	0.52%	17	0.15%	46	0.40%	33	0.29%	1,909	16.64%	11,477
Choctaw	2,859	43.45%	3,680	55.93%	22	0.33%	5	0.08%	14	0.21%	0	0.00%	-821	-12.48%	6,580
Clarke	5,059	47.44%	5,249	49.23%	55	0.52%	197	1.85%	84	0.79%	19	0.18%	-190	-1.79%	10,663
Clay	2,764	48.09%	2,858	49.73%	34	0.59%	34	0.59%	41	0.71%	16	0.28%	-94	-1.64%	5,747
Cleburne	2,389	52.78%	2,050	45.29%	34	0.75%	21	0.46%	27	0.60%	5	0.11%	339	7.49%	4,526
Coffee	6,760	50.45%	6,140	45.82%	189	1.41%	153	1.14%	137	1.02%	20	0.15%	620	4.63%	13,399
Colbert	6,619	33.07%	12,550	62.71%	209	1.04%	315	1.57%	226	1.13%	94	0.47%	-5,931	-29.64%	20,013
Conecuh	2,948	47.69%	3,102	50.19%	29	0.47%	48	0.78%	36	0.58%	18	0.29%	-154	-2.50%	6,181
Coosa	1,714	40.72%	2,383	56.62%	19	0.45%	55	1.31%	25	0.59%	13	0.31%	-669	-15.90%	4,209
Covington	7,014	51.54%	6,305	46.33%	110	0.81%	55	0.40%	70	0.51%	54	0.40%	709	5.21%	13,608
Crenshaw	2,478	47.15%	2,704	51.45%	39	0.74%	11	0.21%	14	0.27%	10	0.19%	-226	-4.30%	5,256
Cullman	10,212	45.92%	11,525	51.82%	228	1.03%	81	0.36%	124	0.56%	70	0.31%	-1,313	-5.90%	22,240
Dale	7,247	57.64%	4,936	39.26%	134	1.07%	112	0.89%	130	1.03%	14	0.11%	2,311	18.38%	12,573
Dallas	7,647	42.14%	9,770	53.84%	131	0.72%	412	2.27%	164	0.90%	23	0.13%	-2,123	-11.70%	18,147
DeKalb	9,673	51.75%	8,820	47.19%	107	0.57%	8	0.04%	51	0.27%	31	0.17%	853	4.56%	18,690
Elmore	8,688	57.20%	5,947	39.15%	171	1.13%	219	1.44%	140	0.92%	25	0.16%	2,741	18.05%	15,190
Escambia	6,513	54.04%	5,148	42.71%	87	0.72%	91	0.75%	136	1.13%	78	0.65%	1,365	11.33%	12,053
Etowah	16,177	42.79%	20,790	54.99%	358	0.95%	147	0.39%	234	0.62%	100	0.26%	-4,613	-12.20%	37,806
Fayette	3,315	48.83%	3,389	49.92%	47	0.69%	4	0.06%	23	0.34%	11	0.16%	-74	-1.09%	6,789
Franklin	4,448	41.33%	6,136	57.01%	51	0.47%	30	0.28%	66	0.61%	32	0.30%	-1,688	-15.68%	10,763
Geneva	4,747	49.30%	4,703	48.85%	67	0.70%	45	0.47%	45	0.47%	21	0.22%	44	0.45%	9,628
Greene	1,034	22.79%	3,474	76.55%	16	0.35%	6	0.13%	7	0.15%	1	0.02%	-2,440	-53.76%	4,538
Hale	2,074	34.69%	3,583	59.93%	56	0.94%	224	3.75%	35	0.59%	7	0.12%	-1,509	-25.24%	5,979
Henry	2,813	47.85%	2,973	50.57%	18	0.31%	29	0.49%	26	0.44%	20	0.34%	-160	-2.72%	5,879
Houston	14,884	64.05%	7,848	33.77%	184	0.79%	104	0.45%	132	0.57%	86	0.37%	7,036	30.28%	23,238
Jackson	4,897	34.48%	8,776	61.79%	156	1.10%	185	1.30%	176	1.24%	13	0.09%	-3,879	-27.31%	14,203
Jefferson	132,612	51.10%	113,069	43.57%	3,509	1.35%	4,054	1.56%	3,243	1.25%	3,025	1.17%	19,543	7.53%	259,512
Lamar	2,778	44.91%	3,366	54.41%	16	0.26%	5	0.08%	15	0.24%	6	0.10%	-588	-9.50%	6,186
Lauderdale	10,467	38.42%	15,379	56.45%	431	1.58%	363	1.33%	496	1.82%	107	0.39%	-4,912	-18.03%	27,243
Lawrence	2,456	28.09%	6,112	69.92%	64	0.73%	30	0.34%	54	0.62%	26	0.30%	-3,656	-41.83%	8,742
Lee	10,982	49.98%	9,606	43.72%	643	2.93%	290	1.32%	421	1.92%	30	0.14%	1,376	6.26%	21,972
Limestone	4,574	34.18%	8,180	61.12%	183	1.37%	258	1.93%	172	1.29%	17	0.13%	-3,606	-26.94%	13,384
Lowndes	1,524	28.60%	3,577	67.12%	15	0.28%	172	3.23%	27	0.51%	14	0.26%	-2,053	-38.52%	5,329
Macon	1,259	14.35%	7,028	80.10%	36	0.41%	366	4.17%	38	0.43%	47	0.54%	-5,769	-65.75%	8,774
Madison	30,604	47.03%	30,469	46.82%	2,246	3.45%	713	1.10%	900	1.38%	140	0.22%	135	0.21%	65,072
Marengo	4,048	41.90%	5,178	53.60%	35	0.36%	255	2.64%	113	1.17%	31	0.32%	-1,130	-11.70%	9,660
Marion	5,182	48.26%	5,450	50.75%	61	0.57%	3	0.03%	28	0.26%	14	0.13%	-268	-2.49%	10,738
Marshall	8,159	40.93%	10,854	54.45%	283	1.42%	254	1.27%	362	1.82%	21	0.11%	-2,695	-13.52%	19,933
Mobile	67,515	57.71%	46,180	39.47%	1,333	1.14%	563	0.48%	899	0.77%	502	0.43%	21,335	18.24%	116,992
Monroe	4,615	50.87%	4,262	46.98%	43	0.47%	51	0.56%	71	0.78%	30	0.33%	353	3.89%	9,072
Montgomery	35,745	53.75%	28,018	42.13%	985	1.48%	1,149	1.73%	503	0.76%	104	0.16%	7,727	11.62%	66,504
Morgan	13,214	45.14%	14,703	50.23%	457	1.56%	297	1.01%	444	1.52%	156	0.53%	-1,489	-5.09%	29,271
Perry	2,262	34.68%	4,208	64.52%	28	0.43%	7	0.11%	13	0.20%	4	0.06%	-1,946	-29.84%	6,522
Pickens	3,582	43.78%	4,504	55.05%	61	0.75%	9	0.11%	22	0.27%	4	0.05%	-922	-11.27%	8,182
Pike	5,220	52.25%	4,417	44.21%	83	0.83%	158	1.58%	74	0.74%	39	0.39%	803	8.04%	9,991
Randolph	3,279	46.22%	3,378	47.62%	58	0.82%	169	2.38%	168	2.37%	42	0.59%	-99	-1.40%	7,094
Russell	4,485	33.22%	8,123	60.17%	137	1.01%	522	3.87%	213	1.58%	20	0.15%	-3,638	-26.95%	13,500
Shelby	14,957	64.28%	7,396	31.79%	407	1.75%	183	0.79%	290	1.25%	34	0.15%	7,561	32.49%	23,267
St. Clair	7,768	56.89%	5,236	38.35%	121	0.89%	190	1.39%	322	2.36%	17	0.12%	2,532	18.54%	13,654
Sumter	2,104	29.23%	5,015	69.66%	45	0.63%	8	0.11%	16	0.22%	11	0.15%	-2,911	-40.43%	7,199
Talladega	9,902	47.97%	10,159	49.22%	140	0.68%	99	0.48%	153	0.74%	188	0.91%	-257	-1.25%	20,641
Tallapoosa	5,958	43.80%	7,260	53.37%	96	0.71%	161	1.18%	88	0.65%	40	0.29%	-1,302	-9.57%	13,603
Tuscaloosa	19,750	48.50%	19,103	46.91%	789	1.94%	582	1.44%	397	0.98%	99	0.24%	647	1.59%	40,720
Walker	8,795	38.53%	13,616	59.65%	82	0.36%	96	0.42%	152	0.67%	87	0.38%	-4,821	-21.12%	22,828
Washington	3,045	45.96%	3,520	53.13%	24	0.36%	2	0.03%	31	0.47%	3	0.05%	-475	-7.17%	6,625
Wilcox	2,280	31.40%	4,951	68.19%	13	0.18%	7	0.10%	8	0.11%	2	0.03%	-2,671	-36.79%	7,261
Winston	4,981	59.04%	3,368	39.92%	39	0.46%	5	0.06%	20	0.24%	23	0.27%	1,613	19.12%	8,436
Totals	654,192	48.75%	636,730	47.45%	16,481	1.23%	15,010	1.12%	13,318	0.99%	6,198	0.46%	17,462	1.30%	1,341,929

==== Counties that flipped from Democratic to Republican ====
- Autauga
- Blount
- Calhoun
- Chiliton
- Cleiburne
- Coffee
- Covington
- DeKalb
- Dale
- Elmore
- Escambia
- Geneva
- Madison
- Monroe
- Pike
- St. Clair
- Tuscaloosa
- Winston

=== Result by congressional district ===
District	Reagan	Carter	Representative
1st	57.5%	41.5%	Jack Edwards
2nd	53.7%	45.2%	William L. Dickinson
3rd	47.0%	51.9%	Bill Nichols
4th	46.5%	52.8%	Tom Bevill
5th	42.2%	55.7%	Ronnie Flippo
6th	54.9%	43.5%	John Hall Buchanan Jr. (96th Congress)
6th	54.9%	43.5%	Albert L. Smith Jr. (97th Congress)
7th	47.6%	51.4%	Richard Shelby

== See also ==
- United States presidential elections in Alabama

== Works cited ==
- Black, Earl; Black, Merle (1992). The Vital South: How Presidents Are Elected. Harvard University Press. ISBN 0674941306.
