= Beaverton, Alabama =

- Town
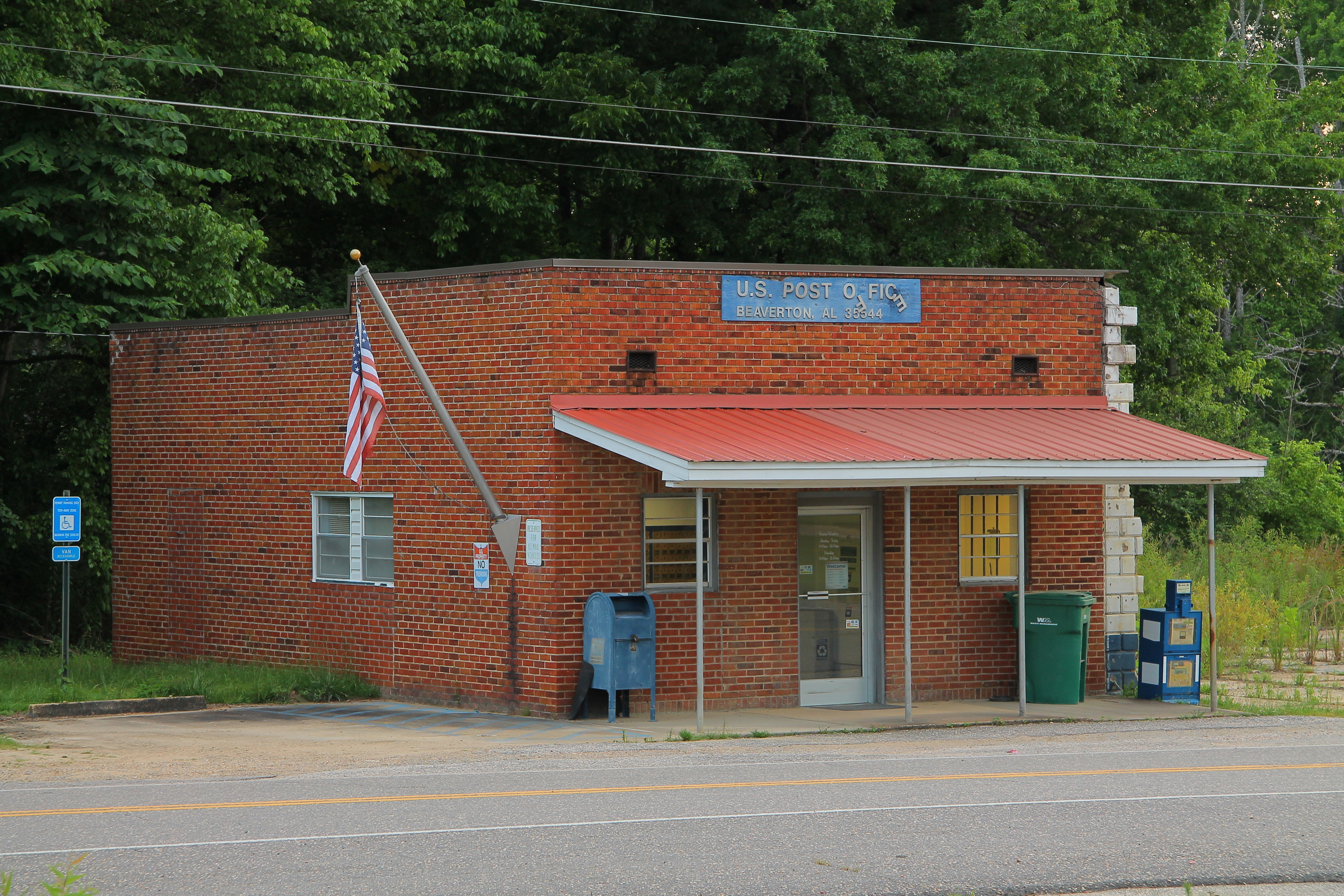
- Post office in Beaverton

- Location of Beaverton in Lamar County, Alabama.
- Coordinates: 33°56′07″N 88°01′18″W
- Country: United States
- State: Alabama
- County: Lamar

Government
  - Type: Mayor-Council
  - Mayor: Susan Chase

Area
  - Total: 4.59 sq mi (11.88 km^{2})
  - Land: 4.59 sq mi (11.88 km^{2})
  - Water: 0 sq mi (0.00 km^{2})
- Elevation: 354 ft (108 m)

Population (2020)
  - Total: 187
  - Density: 40.8/sq mi (15.74/km^{2})
- Time zone: UTC-6 (Central (CST))
  - Summer (DST): UTC-5 (CDT)
- ZIP code: 35544
- Area codes: 205, 659
- FIPS code: 01-04948
- GNIS feature ID: 2405225
- Website: www.townofbeavertonal.com

Beaverton is a town in northeast Lamar County, Alabama, United States. As of the 2020 census, Beaverton had a population of 187.

== Geography ==
According to the U.S. Census Bureau, the town has a total area of 4.6 square miles (12 km^{2}), all land.

The town was established in 1852 and incorporated in 1910.

== Demographics ==
Historical population
Census	Pop.	Note	%±
1930	164		—
1940	231		40.9%
1950	192		−16.9%
1960	162		−15.6%
1970	265		63.6%
1980	360		35.8%
1990	319		−11.4%
2000	226		−29.2%
2010	201		−11.1%
2020	187		−7.0%
U.S. Decennial Census; 2013 Estimate

As of the census of 2000, there were 226 people, 100 households, and 68 families residing in the town. The population density was 49.3 inhabitants per square mile (19.0/km^{2}). There were 125 housing units at an average density of 27.3 per square mile (10.5/km^{2}). The racial makeup of the town was 95.58% White, 3.10% Black or African American, and 1.33% from two or more races.

There were 100 households, out of which 21.0% had children under the age of 18 living with them, 55.0% were married couples living together, 13.0% had a female householder with no husband present, and 32.0% were non-families. 28.0% of all households were made up of individuals, and 15.0% had someone living alone who was 65 years of age or older. The average household size was 2.26 and the average family size was 2.75.

In the town, the population was spread out, with 19.5% under the age of 18, 4.9% from 18 to 24, 30.5% from 25 to 44, 21.7% from 45 to 64, and 23.5% who were 65 years of age or older. The median age was 42 years. For every 100 females, there were 96.5 males. For every 100 females age 18 and over, there were 85.7 males.

The median income for a household in the town was $20,250, and the median income for a family was $38,125. Males had a median income of $27,500 versus $12,019 for females. The per capita income for the town was $12,782. About 7.4% of families and 9.9% of the population were below the poverty line, including 14.3% of those under the age of eighteen and 18.6% of those 65 or over.
