= Fayette County, Alabama =

County in Alabama, United States

- County
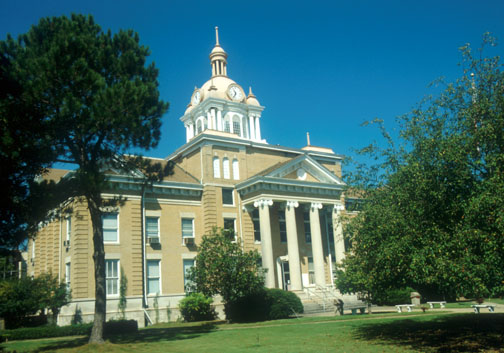
- Fayette County Courthouse in Fayette

- Location within the U.S. state of Alabama
- Coordinates: 33°43′12″N 87°44′19″W
- Country: United States
- State: Alabama
- Founded: December 20, 1824
- Named for: Marquis de Lafayette
- Seat: Fayette
- Largest city: Fayette

Area
  - Total: 629 sq mi (1,630 km^{2})
  - Land: 628 sq mi (1,630 km^{2})
  - Water: 1.7 sq mi (4.4 km^{2}) 0.3%

Population (2020)
  - Total: 16,321
  - Estimate (2025): 15,872 ▼
  - Density: 26.0/sq mi (10.0/km^{2})
- Time zone: UTC−6 (Central)
  - Summer (DST): UTC−5 (CDT)
- Congressional district: 4th
- Website: https://www.fayetteco.net/
- County Number 32 on Alabama Licence Plates

Fayette County is a county located in the U.S. state of Alabama. As of the 2020 census, the population was 16,321. Its county seat is Fayette. Its name is in honor of the Marquis de Lafayette (or de la Fayette), who aided General George Washington in the American Revolutionary War.

== History ==
Fayette County was established on December 20, 1824, during Lafayette's historic tour of the 24 United States

== Geography ==
According to the United States Census Bureau, the county has a total area of 629 square miles (1,630 km^{2}), of which 628 square miles (1,630 km^{2}) is land and 1.7 square miles (4.4 km^{2}) (0.3%) is water.

== Sheriffs Department ==
Sheriff-Byron Yerby

=== Adjacent counties ===
- Marion County (north)
- Walker County (east)
- Tuscaloosa County (southeast)
- Pickens County (southwest)
- Lamar County (west)

== Demographics ==
Historical population
Census	Pop.	Note	%±
1830	3,547		—
1840	6,942		95.7%
1850	9,681		39.5%
1860	12,850		32.7%
1870	7,136		−44.5%
1880	10,135		42.0%
1890	12,823		26.5%
1900	14,132		10.2%
1910	16,248		15.0%
1920	18,365		13.0%
1930	18,443		0.4%
1940	21,651		17.4%
1950	19,388		−10.5%
1960	16,148		−16.7%
1970	16,252		0.6%
1980	18,809		15.7%
1990	17,962		−4.5%
2000	18,495		3.0%
2010	17,241		−6.8%
2020	16,321		−5.3%
2025 (est.)	15,872	▼	−2.8%
U.S. Decennial Census; 1790–1960 1900–1990; 1990–2000 2010–2020

=== 2020 census ===
Fayette County, Alabama – Racial and ethnic composition Note: the US Census treats Hispanic/Latino as an ethnic category. This table excludes Latinos from the racial categories and assigns them to a separate category. Hispanics/Latinos may be of any race.
Race / Ethnicity (NH = Non-Hispanic)	Pop 2000	Pop 2010	Pop 2020	% 2000	% 2010	% 2020
White alone (NH)	15,994	14,832	13,552	86.48%	86.03%	83.03%
Black or African American alone (NH)	2,199	1,958	1,720	11.89%	11.36%	10.54%
Native American or Alaska Native alone (NH)	35	47	43	0.19%	0.27%	0.26%
Asian alone (NH)	28	37	49	0.15%	0.21%	0.30%
Pacific Islander alone (NH)	0	0	1	0.00%	0.00%	0.01%
Other race alone (NH)	1	11	29	0.01%	0.06%	0.18%
Mixed race or Multiracial (NH)	86	152	531	0.46%	0.88%	3.25%
Hispanic or Latino (any race)	152	204	396	0.82%	1.18%	2.43%
Total	18,495	17,241	16,321	100.00%	100.00%	100.00%

As of the 2020 census, the county had a population of 16,321. The median age was 44.3 years. 21.6% of residents were under the age of 18 and 21.8% of residents were 65 years of age or older. For every 100 females there were 95.6 males, and for every 100 females age 18 and over there were 92.5 males age 18 and over.

The racial makeup of the county was 83.7% White, 10.6% Black or African American, 0.4% American Indian and Alaska Native, 0.3% Asian, 0.0% Native Hawaiian and Pacific Islander, 0.9% from some other race, and 4.0% from two or more races. Hispanic or Latino residents of any race comprised 2.4% of the population.

0.0% of residents lived in urban areas, while 100.0% lived in rural areas.

There were 6,653 households in the county, of which 29.0% had children under the age of 18 living with them and 27.7% had a female householder with no spouse or partner present. About 29.1% of all households were made up of individuals and 14.9% had someone living alone who was 65 years of age or older.

There were 7,760 housing units, of which 14.3% were vacant. Among occupied housing units, 75.3% were owner-occupied and 24.7% were renter-occupied. The homeowner vacancy rate was 1.6% and the rental vacancy rate was 8.2%.

=== 2010 census ===
As of the census of 2010, there were 17,241 people, 7,493 households, and 5,342 families residing in the county. The population density was 30 people per square mile (12 people/km^{2}). There were 8,472 housing units at an average density of 14 units per square mile (5.4 units/km^{2}). The racial makeup of the county was 86.92% White, 11.93% Black or African American, 0.21% Native American, 0.15% Asian, 0.01% Pacific Islander, 0.27% from other races, and 0.51% from two or more races. 0.82% of the population were Hispanic or Latino of any race.

As of 2012 the largest self-reported ancestry groups in Fayette County were:

- 44.9% English
- 16.9% "American"
- 4.1% Irish

There were 7,493 households, out of which 30.80% had children under the age of 18 living with them, 57.30% were married couples living together, 10.60% had a female householder with no husband present, and 28.70% were non-families. 26.60% of all households were made up of individuals, and 13.50% had someone living alone who was 65 years of age or older. The average household size was 2.42 and the average family size was 2.92.

In the county, the population was spread out, with 22.30% under the age of 18, 8.20% from 18 to 24, 26.50% from 25 to 44, 25.30% from 45 to 64, and 17.90% who were 65 years of age or older. The median age was 39 years. For every 100 females, there were 93.50 males. For every 100 females age 18 and over, there were 89.60 males.

The median income for a household in the county was $28,539, and the median income for a family was $34,560. Males had a median income of $29,239 versus $20,606 for females. The per capita income for the county was $14,439. About 13.10% of families and 17.90% of the population were below the poverty line, including 22.30% of those under age 18 and 17.90% of those age 65 or over.

=== Life expectancy ===
Of 3,143 counties in the United States in 2013, Fayette County ranked 2,882 in the longevity of male residents and 3,091 of female residents. Males in Fayette County lived an average of 71.2 years and females lived an average of 75.3 years compared to the national average for longevity of 76.5 for males and 81.2 for females. The average longevity of men in Fayette County increased by 2.0 years from 1985 to 2013 compared to a national average for the same period of an increased life span for men of 5.5 years. The average longevity, however, for females in Fayette County declined by 4.2 years between 1985 and 2013 compared to the national average for the same period of an increased life span of 3.1 years for women. High rates of smoking and obesity and a low rate of physical activity appear to be contributing factors to the low level of longevity for both sexes.

One study concluded that Fayette County between 1985 and 2010 was one of the few U.S. counties which saw a decline in the longevity of women and that the decline in female longevity in Fayette Country was the largest of any county in the nation.

== Education ==
Fayette County Schools:

- Berry High School
- Berry Elementary School
- Fayette County High School
- Fayette Middle School
- Fayette Elementary School
- Hubbertville School

== Transportation ==
=== Major highways ===
- U.S. Highway 43
- State Route 13
- State Route 18
- State Route 96
- State Route 102
- State Route 107
- State Route 129
- State Route 159
- State Route 171
- State Route 233

=== Airport ===
Richard Arthur Field (Municipal)- A 5,000 ft (1,500 m) paved runway with JET A and 100LL fuel service. Located about 3 miles (4.8 km) northeast of the city center.

=== Rail ===
- BNSF Railway
- Norfolk Southern Railway
- Luxapalila Valley Railroad

== Government ==
Fayette County is reliably Republican at the presidential level. The last Democrat to win the county in a presidential election is Bill Clinton, who won it by a plurality in 1996.

United States presidential election results for Fayette County, Alabama
Year	Republican		Democratic		Third party(ies)	
Year	No.	%	No.	%	No.	%
1904	599	39.43%	712	46.87%	208	13.69%
1908	678	43.80%	731	47.22%	139	8.98%
1912	434	28.52%	762	50.07%	326	21.42%
1916	697	39.69%	1,026	58.43%	33	1.88%
1920	1,865	56.36%	1,413	42.70%	31	0.94%
1924	977	41.26%	1,358	57.35%	33	1.39%
1928	1,686	59.83%	1,131	40.13%	1	0.04%
1932	733	26.47%	2,013	72.70%	23	0.83%
1936	732	24.41%	2,244	74.82%	23	0.77%
1940	737	25.88%	2,091	73.42%	20	0.70%
1944	913	35.51%	1,648	64.10%	10	0.39%
1948	580	35.76%	0	0.00%	1,042	64.24%
1952	1,481	39.19%	2,287	60.52%	11	0.29%
1956	1,948	49.59%	1,956	49.80%	24	0.61%
1960	1,923	45.73%	2,274	54.08%	8	0.19%
1964	3,203	71.34%	0	0.00%	1,287	28.66%
1968	827	13.26%	676	10.84%	4,735	75.91%
1972	4,240	83.53%	836	16.47%	0	0.00%
1976	2,165	34.44%	4,076	64.83%	46	0.73%
1980	3,315	48.83%	3,389	49.92%	85	1.25%
1984	4,654	64.63%	2,533	35.18%	14	0.19%
1988	4,338	57.40%	3,186	42.16%	33	0.44%
1992	3,604	42.55%	3,830	45.22%	1,036	12.23%
1996	3,191	44.26%	3,381	46.90%	637	8.84%
2000	4,582	58.68%	3,064	39.24%	162	2.07%
2004	5,534	69.16%	2,408	30.09%	60	0.75%
2008	5,883	73.93%	1,994	25.06%	80	1.01%
2012	6,054	76.07%	1,817	22.83%	87	1.09%
2016	6,712	81.37%	1,362	16.51%	175	2.12%
2020	7,300	83.28%	1,395	15.91%	71	0.81%
2024	7,158	85.53%	1,142	13.65%	69	0.82%

United States Senate election results for Fayette County, Alabama2
Year	Republican		Democratic		Third party(ies)	
Year	No.	%	No.	%	No.	%
2020	7,088	81.00%	1,651	18.87%	12	0.14%

United States Senate election results for Fayette County, Alabama3
Year	Republican		Democratic		Third party(ies)	
Year	No.	%	No.	%	No.	%
2022	4,697	85.38%	690	12.54%	114	2.07%

Alabama Gubernatorial election results for Fayette County
Year	Republican		Democratic		Third party(ies)	
Year	No.	%	No.	%	No.	%
2022	4,708	85.40%	628	11.39%	177	3.21%

== Communities ==
=== Cities ===
- Fayette (county seat)
- Winfield (partly in Marion County)

=== Towns ===
- Belk
- Berry
- Glen Allen (partly in Marion County)
- Gu-Win (partly in Marion County)

=== Unincorporated communities ===
- Bankston
- Bazemore
- Bluff
- Boley Springs
- Covin
- Flatwoods
- Howard
- Hubbertville
- Newtonville
- Studdards Crossroads

== See also ==
- National Register of Historic Places listings in Fayette County, Alabama
- Properties on the Alabama Register of Landmarks and Heritage in Fayette County, Alabama
