= Vernon, Alabama =

City in Alabama, United States

Vernon
- City
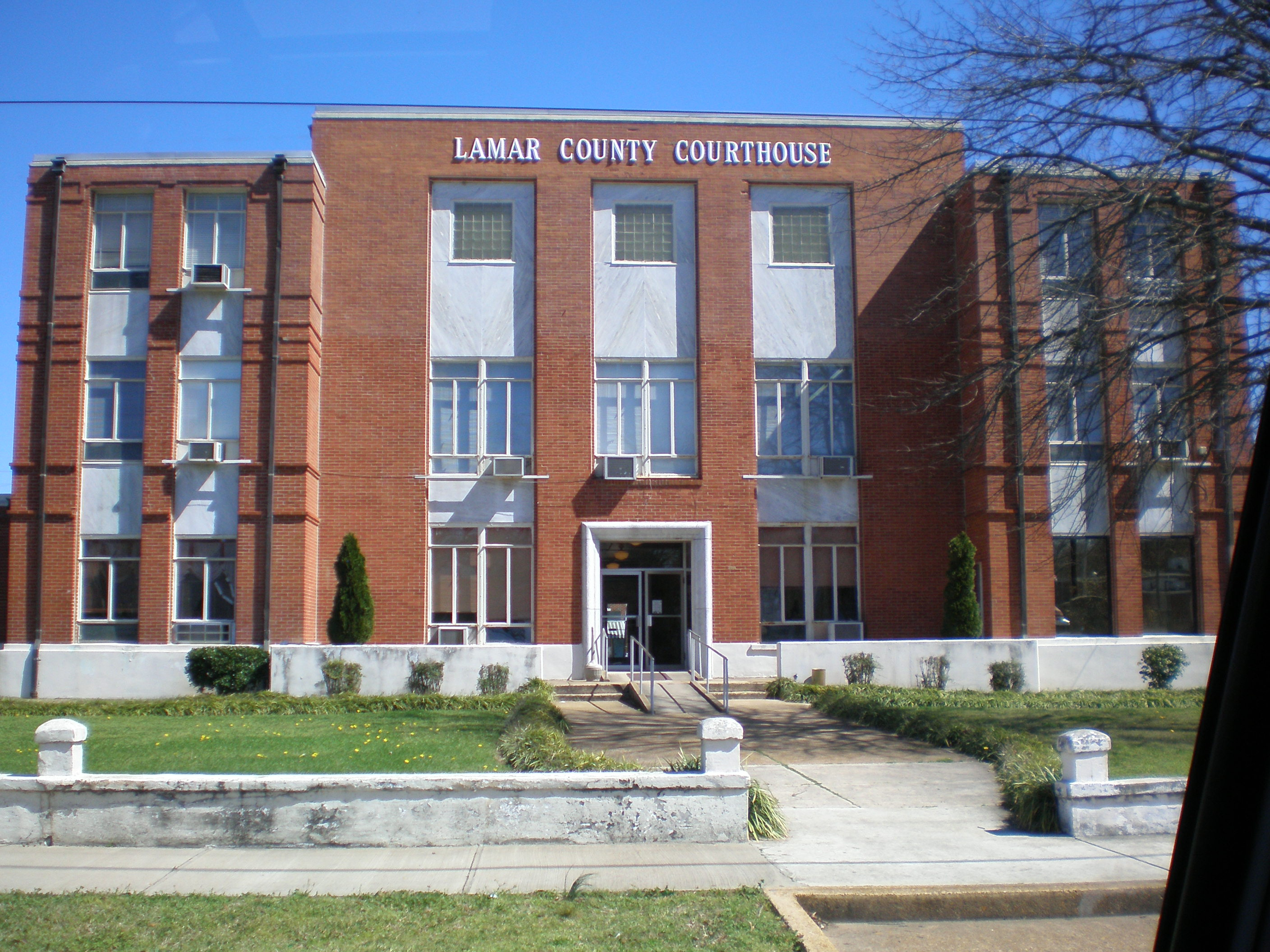
- Lamar County courthouse in Vernon

- Location of Vernon in Lamar County, Alabama.
- Coordinates: 33°45′23″N 88°06′41″W
- Country: United States
- State: Alabama
- County: Lamar

Area
  - Total: 5.89 sq mi (15.26 km^{2})
  - Land: 5.89 sq mi (15.26 km^{2})
  - Water: 0 sq mi (0.00 km^{2})
- Elevation: 364 ft (111 m)

Population (2020)
  - Total: 1,921
  - Density: 326.0/sq mi (125.85/km^{2})
- Time zone: UTC-6 (Central (CST))
  - Summer (DST): UTC-5 (CDT)
- ZIP code: 35592
- Area codes: 205, 659
- FIPS code: 01-78480
- GNIS feature ID: 2405641

Vernon is a city in Lamar County, Alabama, United States. The city is the county seat of Lamar County, and previously served as the seat of its two predecessors, Jones County (not to be confused with Covington County), which briefly existed in 1867, and for Sanford County from 1868 until it was renamed Lamar in 1877. It incorporated in 1870. As of the 2020 census, Vernon had a population of 1,921.

== Geography ==
According to the U.S. Census Bureau, the city has a total area of 5.9 square miles (15 km^{2}), all land.

=== Climate ===
Climate data for Vernon, Alabama, 1991–2020 normals, extremes 1956–present
Month	Jan	Feb	Mar	Apr	May	Jun	Jul	Aug	Sep	Oct	Nov	Dec	Year
Record high °F (°C)	82 (28)	85 (29)	89 (32)	94 (34)	100 (38)	104 (40)	105 (41)	109 (43)	104 (40)	102 (39)	89 (32)	81 (27)	109 (43)
Mean maximum °F (°C)	71.6 (22.0)	75.9 (24.4)	82.0 (27.8)	85.6 (29.8)	91.0 (32.8)	94.9 (34.9)	97.8 (36.6)	97.7 (36.5)	94.8 (34.9)	88.1 (31.2)	79.6 (26.4)	72.8 (22.7)	99.2 (37.3)
Mean daily maximum °F (°C)	55.0 (12.8)	59.4 (15.2)	68.0 (20.0)	75.9 (24.4)	82.7 (28.2)	89.0 (31.7)	91.8 (33.2)	91.8 (33.2)	86.7 (30.4)	77.1 (25.1)	65.6 (18.7)	57.1 (13.9)	75.0 (23.9)
Daily mean °F (°C)	44.2 (6.8)	48.1 (8.9)	55.8 (13.2)	62.9 (17.2)	71.1 (21.7)	78.2 (25.7)	81.2 (27.3)	80.9 (27.2)	75.1 (23.9)	64.2 (17.9)	53.8 (12.1)	46.6 (8.1)	63.5 (17.5)
Mean daily minimum °F (°C)	33.4 (0.8)	36.9 (2.7)	43.7 (6.5)	49.9 (9.9)	59.5 (15.3)	67.5 (19.7)	70.6 (21.4)	69.9 (21.1)	63.4 (17.4)	51.2 (10.7)	42.0 (5.6)	36.0 (2.2)	52.0 (11.1)
Mean minimum °F (°C)	14.2 (−9.9)	18.2 (−7.7)	23.8 (−4.6)	32.4 (0.2)	42.8 (6.0)	55.5 (13.1)	62.0 (16.7)	60.2 (15.7)	48.2 (9.0)	32.8 (0.4)	23.2 (−4.9)	19.1 (−7.2)	11.9 (−11.2)
Record low °F (°C)	−11 (−24)	1 (−17)	6 (−14)	20 (−7)	30 (−1)	38 (3)	49 (9)	46 (8)	33 (1)	21 (−6)	9 (−13)	−3 (−19)	−11 (−24)
Average precipitation inches (mm)	5.26 (134)	4.94 (125)	5.56 (141)	5.94 (151)	5.39 (137)	4.72 (120)	5.35 (136)	3.49 (89)	3.36 (85)	3.82 (97)	4.61 (117)	6.01 (153)	58.45 (1,485)
Average snowfall inches (cm)	0.3 (0.76)	0.0 (0.0)	0.2 (0.51)	0.0 (0.0)	0.0 (0.0)	0.0 (0.0)	0.0 (0.0)	0.0 (0.0)	0.0 (0.0)	0.0 (0.0)	0.0 (0.0)	0.0 (0.0)	0.5 (1.27)
Average precipitation days (≥ 0.01 in)	10.3	7.8	8.8	6.6	7.4	8.9	8.6	7.0	5.2	5.7	7.7	8.9	92.9
Average snowy days (≥ 0.1 in)	0.2	0.0	0.0	0.0	0.0	0.0	0.0	0.0	0.0	0.0	0.0	0.0	0.2
Source 1: NOAA
Source 2: National Weather Service

== History ==
The city of Vernon was originally known as Swayne Courthouse; it was named for the head of the Freedman's Bureau, General Wager Swayne, who served in the Chattahoochee District of the state. Many of the records of this time were lost, when the courthouse burned in 1866. The name of the town was changed in 1868 to Vernon after Edmund Vernon.

Both before and after the Civil war, the economy of Vernon was based on timber, agriculture, and milling. After the Civil War, the plantations were sold off to timber interests, which eliminated many jobs. Since the end of Reconstruction, Vernon has experienced waves of manufacturing with textile factories being introduced in the early 20th century. All of these textile factories no longer exist. Some manufacturers remain, such as Marathon, an international manufacturer of trash compactors.

== Demographics ==
Historical population
Census	Pop.	Note	%±
1880	208		—
1890	192		−7.7%
1900	291		51.6%
1910	423		45.4%
1920	440		4.0%
1930	519		18.0%
1940	759		46.2%
1950	791		4.2%
1960	1,492		88.6%
1970	2,190		46.8%
1980	2,609		19.1%
1990	2,247		−13.9%
2000	2,143		−4.6%
2010	2,000		−6.7%
2020	1,921		−3.9%
U.S. Decennial Census; 2013 Estimate

=== 2020 census ===
As of the 2020 census, Vernon had a population of 1,921. The median age was 39.9 years. 25.6% of residents were under the age of 18 and 18.0% of residents were 65 years of age or older. For every 100 females there were 82.6 males, and for every 100 females age 18 and over there were 76.9 males age 18 and over.

0.0% of residents lived in urban areas, while 100.0% lived in rural areas.

There were 863 households in Vernon, of which 32.0% had children under the age of 18 living in them. Of all households, 36.7% were married-couple households, 19.2% were households with a male householder and no spouse or partner present, and 39.9% were households with a female householder and no spouse or partner present. About 37.6% of all households were made up of individuals and 17.1% had someone living alone who was 65 years of age or older.

There were 1,011 housing units, of which 14.6% were vacant. The homeowner vacancy rate was 1.8% and the rental vacancy rate was 14.1%.

Racial composition as of the 2020 census
Race	Number	Percent
White	1,513	78.8%
Black or African American	294	15.3%
American Indian and Alaska Native	4	0.2%
Asian	0	0.0%
Native Hawaiian and Other Pacific Islander	0	0.0%
Some other race	17	0.9%
Two or more races	93	4.8%
Hispanic or Latino (of any race)	27	1.4%

=== 2010 census ===
At the 2010 census there were 2,000 people in 890 households, including 569 families, in the city. The population density was 339 inhabitants per square mile (131/km^{2}). There were 1,033 housing units at an average density of 175.1 per square mile (67.6/km^{2}). The racial makeup of the city was 79.4% White, 18.1% Black or African American, 0.3% Native American, 0.0% Asian, and 1.2% from two or more races. 1.7% of the population were Hispanic or Latino of any race. Of the 890 households 30.4% had children under the age of 18 living with them, 41.1% were married couples living together, 17.9% had a female householder with no husband present, and 36.1% were non-families. 33.4% of households were one person and 14.2% were one person aged 65 or older. The average household size was 2.25 and the average family size was 2.86.

The age distribution was 26.3% under the age of 18, 8.2% from 18 to 24, 23.6% from 25 to 44, 26.3% from 45 to 64, and 15.8% 65 or older. The median age was 38.1 years. For every 100 females, there were 81.8 males. For every 100 females age 18 and over, there were 79.7 males.

The median household income was $34,236 and the median family income was $43,950. Males had a median income of $41,339 versus $21,331 for females. The per capita income for the city was $16,814. About 15.9% of families and 19.6% of the population were below the poverty line, including 22.2% of those under age 18 and 10.6% of those age 65 or over.

=== 2000 census ===
At the 2000 census there were 2,143 people in 953 households, including 630 families, in the city. The population density was 362.2 inhabitants per square mile (139.8/km^{2}). There were 1,070 housing units at an average density of 180.9 per square mile (69.8/km^{2}). The racial makeup of the city was 86.19% White, 12.65% Black or African American, 0.23% Native American, 0.05% Asian, and 0.89% from two or more races. 0.65% of the population were Hispanic or Latino of any race. Of the 953 households 31.3% had children under the age of 18 living with them, 45.5% were married couples living together, 18.4% had a female householder with no husband present, and 33.8% were non-families. 32.3% of households were one person and 15.6% were one person aged 65 or older. The average household size was 2.19 and the average family size was 2.75.

The age distribution was 24.1% under the age of 18, 8.5% from 18 to 24, 26.9% from 25 to 44, 23.0% from 45 to 64, and 17.5% 65 or older. The median age was 38 years. For every 100 females, there were 83.0 males. For every 100 females age 18 and over, there were 78.2 males.

The median household income was $27,344 and the median family income was $36,618. Males had a median income of $31,550 versus $19,470 for females. The per capita income for the city was $14,784. About 10.7% of families and 15.6% of the population were below the poverty line, including 19.2% of those under age 18 and 21.6% of those age 65 or over.

== Notable people ==
- Reuben Houston "Rube" Burrow, the most wanted outlaw of the late 1880s.
- Dixie McArthur, former Major League Baseball pitcher
- Terry Moore, born in Vernon, major league baseball player
- Guy Morton, born in Vernon, major league baseball player
- Dan Penn, songwriter, born in Vernon.
- William Hall Smith, president of Mississippi State University from 1916 to 1920.
