= Millport, Alabama =

- Town
- Location of Millport in Lamar County, Alabama.
- Coordinates: 33°33′31″N 88°04′54″W
- Country: United States
- State: Alabama
- County: Lamar

Area
  - Total: 5.51 sq mi (14.26 km^{2})
  - Land: 5.49 sq mi (14.23 km^{2})
  - Water: 0.015 sq mi (0.04 km^{2})
- Elevation: 299 ft (91 m)

Population (2020)
  - Total: 1,010
  - Density: 180/sq mi (71/km^{2})
- Time zone: UTC-6 (Central (CST))
  - Summer (DST): UTC-5 (CDT)
- ZIP code: 35576
- Area codes: 205, 659
- FIPS code: 01-48808
- GNIS feature ID: 2406164

Millport is a town in Lamar County, Alabama, United States. It incorporated in 1887. As of the 2020 census, Millport had a population of 1,010. After its incorporation from 1890 to 1900, it was the largest town in Lamar County, losing the distinction to Sulligent. Since 1940, it has been the 3rd largest town.

== Geography ==
According to the U.S. Census Bureau, the town has a total area of 5.4 square miles (14 km^{2}), of which 5.4 square miles (14 km^{2}) is land and 0.18% is water.

== Demographics ==
Historical population
Census	Pop.	Note	%±
1890	244		—
1900	357		46.3%
1910	529		48.2%
1920	604		14.2%
1930	714		18.2%
1940	700		−2.0%
1950	682		−2.6%
1960	943		38.3%
1970	1,070		13.5%
1980	1,287		20.3%
1990	1,203		−6.5%
2000	1,160		−3.6%
2010	1,049		−9.6%
2020	1,010		−3.7%
U.S. Decennial Census; 2013 Estimate

=== 2020 census ===
As of the 2020 census, there were 1,010 people, 464 households, and 274 families residing in the town. The median age was 42.7 years. 21.0% of residents were under the age of 18 and 22.3% of residents were 65 years of age or older. For every 100 females there were 91.7 males, and for every 100 females age 18 and over there were 86.4 males age 18 and over.

0.0% of residents lived in urban areas, while 100.0% lived in rural areas.

Of the 464 households in Millport, 28.0% had children under the age of 18 living in them. Of all households, 37.5% were married-couple households, 24.1% were households with a male householder and no spouse or partner present, and 34.7% were households with a female householder and no spouse or partner present. About 38.6% of all households were made up of individuals, and 19.9% had someone living alone who was 65 years of age or older.

There were 531 housing units, of which 12.6% were vacant. The homeowner vacancy rate was 1.0% and the rental vacancy rate was 9.2%.

Racial composition as of the 2020 census
Race	Number	Percent
White	662	65.5%
Black or African American	299	29.6%
American Indian and Alaska Native	6	0.6%
Asian	0	0.0%
Native Hawaiian and Other Pacific Islander	0	0.0%
Some other race	5	0.5%
Two or more races	38	3.8%
Hispanic or Latino (of any race)	11	1.1%

=== 2010 census ===
At the 2010 census there were 1,049 people, 453 households, and 304 families living in the town. The population density was 194.3 inhabitants per square mile (75.0/km^{2}). There were 536 housing units at an average density of 99.3 per square mile (38.3/km^{2}). The racial makeup of the town was 64.7% White, 33.7% Black, 0.1% Native American, and 1.3% from two or more races. Of the 453 households 27.6% had children under the age of 18 living with them, 43.7% were married couples living together, 19.4% had a female householder with no husband present, and 32.9% were non-families. 30.9% of households were one person and 15.0% were one person aged 65 or older. The average household size was 2.32 and the average family size was 2.88.

The age distribution was 23.1% under the age of 18, 9.9% from 18 to 24, 24.0% from 25 to 44, 25.0% from 45 to 64, and 18.0% 65 or older. The median age was 39.4 years. For every 100 females, there were 83.1 males. For every 100 females age 18 and over, there were 83.9 males.

The median household income was $23,722 and the median family income was $24,597. Males had a median income of $34,125 versus $22,153 for females. The per capita income for the town was $15,309. About 18.5% of families and 21.8% of the population were below the poverty line, including 31.7% of those under age 18 and 7.5% of those age 65 or over.

=== 2000 census ===
At the 2000 census there were 1,160 people, 495 households, and 328 families living in the town. The population density was 213.7 inhabitants per square mile (82.5/km^{2}). There were 561 housing units at an average density of 103.3 per square mile (39.9/km^{2}). The racial makeup of the town was 65.52% White, 33.97% Black, 0.09% Native American, and 0.43% from two or more races. Of the 495 households 28.5% had children under the age of 18 living with them, 46.1% were married couples living together, 16.4% had a female householder with no husband present, and 33.7% were non-families. 32.5% of households were one person and 15.8% were one person aged 65 or older. The average household size was 2.34 and the average family size was 2.96.

The age distribution was 24.0% under the age of 18, 8.8% from 18 to 24, 26.6% from 25 to 44, 24.1% from 45 to 64, and 16.6% 65 or older. The median age was 38 years. For every 100 females, there were 85.9 males. For every 100 females age 18 and over, there were 84.1 males.

The median household income was $26,458 and the median family income was $33,869. Males had a median income of $30,521 versus $17,396 for females. The per capita income for the town was $12,822. About 18.2% of families and 21.0% of the population were below the poverty line, including 25.4% of those under age 18 and 28.7% of those age 65 or over.

== Government ==
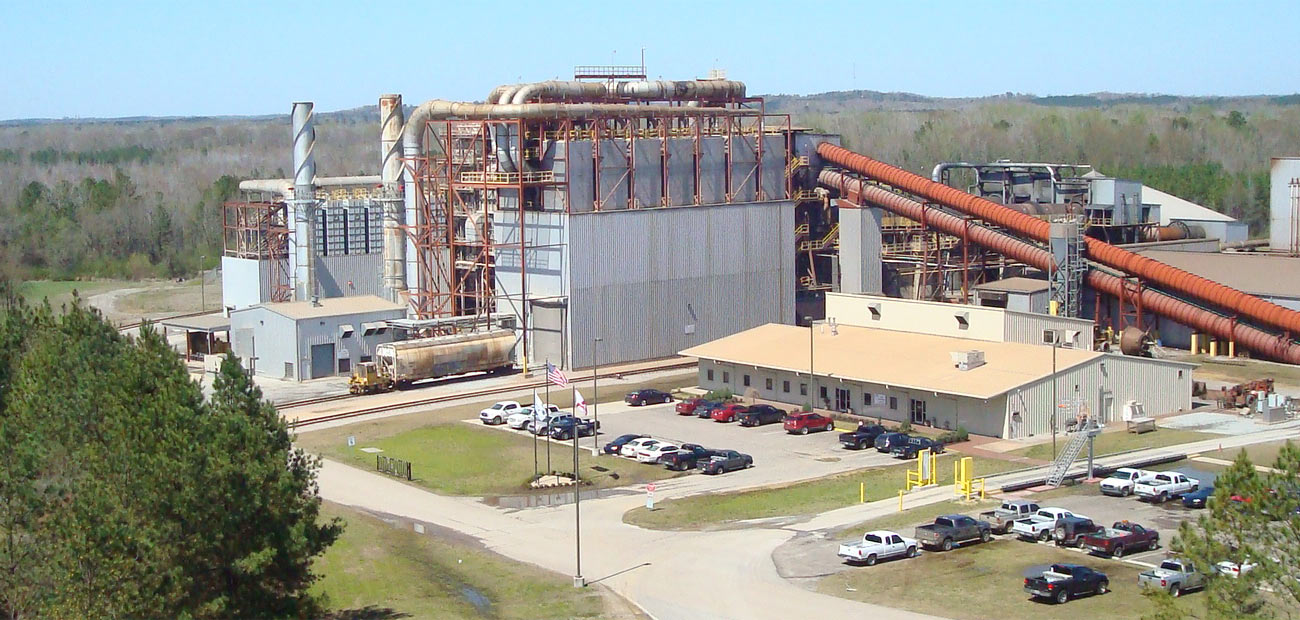
A Steel Dust Recycling plant in Millport, August 2019

- Mayor:
- Town Clerk:

== 2005 bankruptcy ==
Millport filed for chapter 9 bankruptcy in 2005 after mayor Waymon Fields, who was a former banker and was elected in 2004, discovered that the town was almost $3.5 million behind in payments and was facing its water and sewer system being taken over by the federal government because of missed payments.

== Education ==
South Lamar School is in Millport.

== Notable people ==
- Bill Atkins, former Auburn University and NFL player
- Mae Beavers, member of the Tennessee Senate
- Ray B. Browne, Distinguished Professor Emeritus at Bowling Green State University

== See also ==
- List of cities and towns in Alabama
