= Kennedy, Alabama =

- Town
- Location of Kennedy in Lamar County, Alabama.
- Coordinates: 33°34′36″N 87°59′42″W
- Country: United States
- State: Alabama
- County: Lamar

Area
  - Total: 3.20 sq mi (8.28 km^{2})
  - Land: 3.20 sq mi (8.28 km^{2})
  - Water: 0 sq mi (0.00 km^{2})
- Elevation: 387 ft (118 m)

Population (2020)
  - Total: 435
  - Density: 136.1/sq mi (52.55/km^{2})
- Time zone: UTC−6 (Central (CST))
  - Summer (DST): UTC−5 (CDT)
- ZIP code: 35574
- Area code: 205, 659
- FIPS code: 01-39520
- GNIS feature ID: 2405936

Kennedy is a town in Lamar County, Alabama, United States. It was incorporated by an act of the legislature on February 18, 1895. As of the 2020 census, Kennedy had a population of 435.

== Geography ==
According to the U.S. Census Bureau, the town has a total area of 3.1 square miles (8.0 km^{2}), all land.

== Demographics ==
Historical population
Census	Pop.	Note	%±
1900	166		—
1910	261		57.2%
1920	203		−22.2%
1930	277		36.5%
1940	367		32.5%
1950	393		7.1%
1960	379		−3.6%
1970	415		9.5%
1980	604		45.5%
1990	523		−13.4%
2000	541		3.4%
2010	447		−17.4%
2020	435		−2.7%
U.S. Decennial Census; 2013 Estimate

According to the 2020 census, Kennedy had a population of 435, representing a decrease of approximately 19.6% from the 541 residents in the 2000 census. According to the 2020-2024 American COmmunity Survey (ACS) five-year estimates, the town had an estimated population of 436, with a population density of approximately 136.7 inhabitants per square mile (52.8/km^2). The ACS estimated 223 housing units, of which 182 were occupied.

The racial and ethnic composition of the town, according to the 2020-2024 ACS estimates, was 85.3% non-hispanic White, 6.7% Black or African American, 7.3% Hispanic or Latino of any race, and 0.7% multiracial.

According to the 2020-2024 ACS estimates, there were 182 households, of which 59.9% were family households and 40.1% were non-family households. Married-couple families accounted for approximately 50.5% of all households, while 9.3% were female-householder families without a spouse present. Approximately 39.0% of households consisted of individuals living alone. The average household size was 2.4 persons and the average family size of 3.3.

The age distribution of the population was 18.3% under the age of 18, 59.0% between the ages of 18 and 64, and 22.7 aged 65 or older. The median age was 49 years. The population was 48.6% male and 51.4% female, representing approximately 94.6 males for every 100 females.

According to the 2020-2024 ACS estimates, the median household income in Kennedy was $41,136, while the per capita income was $32,311. Approximately 12.8% of the population lived below the poverty line, including 16.3% of those under the age of 18 and 18.2% of those are aged 65 years or older.

== Government ==
Mayor: Jackie Mitchell Chief of Police: Jake Fowler

== Notable people ==
- William J. Hibbler, former United States federal judge
- John C. McAdams, associate professor of political science at Marquette University
- Jake Propst, Major League Baseball player for the Washington Senators
- Lee Stripling, singer and fiddler

== See also ==
- List of cities and towns in Alabama
