= Sulligent, Alabama =

City in Alabama, United States

- Town
- Location of Sulligent in Lamar County, Alabama.
- Coordinates: 33°53′30″N 88°07′36″W
- Country: United States
- State: Alabama
- County: Lamar

Area
  - Total: 7.83 sq mi (20.29 km^{2})
  - Land: 7.83 sq mi (20.29 km^{2})
  - Water: 0 sq mi (0.00 km^{2})
- Elevation: 394 ft (120 m)

Population (2020)
  - Total: 1,879
  - Density: 240/sq mi (92.6/km^{2})
- Time zone: UTC-6 (Central (CST))
  - Summer (DST): UTC-5 (CDT)
- ZIP code: 35586
- Area codes: 205, 659
- FIPS code: 01-73728
- GNIS feature ID: 2405539
- Website: sulligent.org

Sulligent is a town in Lamar County, Alabama, United States. As of the 2010 census, the population of the town was 1,927, down from its record high of 2,151 in 2000. From 1910 to 1950 and again in 2000, it was the largest community in Lamar County before losing the distinction both times to the county seat of Vernon.

== History ==
Sulligent was first called Elliott, in honor of the chief engineer of the Kansas City-Memphis-Birmingham Railroad, then renamed one month later with the portmanteau "Sulligent", in honor of Sullivan, the superintendent of the railroad, and Sargeant, the passenger agent of the railroad. The town was incorporated on February 12, 1897. S. F. Pennington owned the first general store, and Dr. R. J. Redden owned the first drug store.

The production and processing of cotton was an important industry. The primary business in Sulligent in the mid-1890s was cotton, with over 2500 bales ginned each year and shipped via the railroad. At one time, Sulligent Cotton Oil Company was known as the largest cotton gin under one roof.

Sulligent is home to Lamar County's only structure listed on the National Register of Historic Places, the Greer Bankhead House, which antedates the city by almost four decades.

The Ogden House was the first home built inside of the incorporated city of Sulligent. The house had stood since 1888 and had served as the home of William W. and Tallulah Henson Ogden. William W. Ogden was the owner of the Sulligent Cotton Oil Company, a planter, banker, mayor of Sulligent 1919–1921, and member of the Alabama House of Representatives 1931–1934. Leila Ogden, daughter of the builder, presented this house to the Town of Sulligent in 1975, where it acted as the public library until the late 1990s when the current public library was built.In 2023, Mayor Scott Boman and the City Council elected to demolish the historical site of The Ogden House instead of restoring the structure.

In 2025 Randy Otts was elected mayor and sworn into office in early 2026. Mayor Otts was only in office for a few months before he resigned and the city council of Sulligent voted in former mayor Scott Boman back in as mayor in March of 2026.According to the March 31, 2026 edition of the WTVA News, The city of Sulligent has a new mayor, but many residents are not happy about the decision.

== Geography ==
According to the U.S. Census Bureau, the city has a total area of 7.8 square miles (20 km^{2}), all land.

U.S. Route 278 (US 278) passes through Sulligent, intersecting State Route 17 (SR 17) at the center of town.

The BNSF Railway provides railroad service with a line running east–west.

== Demographics ==
Historical population
Census	Pop.	Note	%±
1900	303		—
1910	619		104.3%
1920	1,071		73.0%
1930	1,078		0.7%
1940	1,287		19.4%
1950	1,209		−6.1%
1960	1,346		11.3%
1970	1,762		30.9%
1980	2,130		20.9%
1990	1,886		−11.5%
2000	2,151		14.1%
2010	1,927		−10.4%
2020	1,879		−2.5%
U.S. Decennial Census; 2013 Estimate

=== 2000 census ===
At the 2000 census there were 2,151 people in 901 households, including 637 families, in the city. The population density was 273.9 inhabitants per square mile (105.8/km^{2}). There were 1,029 housing units at an average density of 131.0 per square mile (50.6/km^{2}). The racial makeup of the city was 77.08% White, 21.80% Black or African American, 0.60% from other races, and 0.51% from two or more races. 1.58% of the population were Hispanic or Latino of any race. Of the 901 households 29.2% had children under the age of 18 living with them, 52.9% were married couples living together, 13.7% had a female householder with no husband present, and 29.3% were non-families. 28.0% of households were one person and 15.2% were one person aged 65 or older. The average household size was 2.39 and the average family size was 2.90.

The age distribution was 23.6% under the age of 18, 9.1% from 18 to 24, 26.8% from 25 to 44, 24.4% from 45 to 64, and 16.1% 65 or older. The median age was 39 years. For every 100 females, there were 87.2 males. For every 100 females age 18 and over, there were 84.2 males.

The median household income was $26,541 and the median family income was $30,645. Males had a median income of $29,966 versus $19,537 for females. The per capita income for the city was $15,794. About 18.0% of families and 21.0% of the population were below the poverty line, including 22.7% of those under age 18 and 27.1% of those age 65 or over.

=== 2010 census ===
At the 2010 census there were 1,927 people in 859 households, including 551 families, in the city. The population density was 243.9 inhabitants per square mile (94.2/km^{2}). There were 972 housing units at an average density of 123.0 per square mile (47.5/km^{2}). The racial makeup of the city was 78.3% White, 19.3% Black or African American, 0.3% from other races, and 2.0% from two or more races. .8% of the population were Hispanic or Latino of any race. Of the 859 households 25.5% had children under the age of 18 living with them, 45.9% were married couples living together, 14.2% had a female householder with no husband present, and 35.9% were non-families. 34.0% of households were one person and 15.1% were one person aged 65 or older. The average household size was 2.24 and the average family size was 2.86.

The age distribution was 23.1% under the age of 18, 7.0% from 18 to 24, 21.0% from 25 to 44, 30.1% from 45 to 64, and 18.8% 65 or older. The median age was 43.6 years. For every 100 females, there were 90.0 males. For every 100 females age 18 and over, there were 90.5 males.

The median household income was $22,469 and the median family income was $34,231. Males had a median income of $36,125 versus $30,167 for females. The per capita income for the city was $17,094. About 18.1% of families and 18.7% of the population were below the poverty line, including 17.3% of those under age 18 and 15.8% of those age 65 or over.

=== 2020 census ===
Sulligent racial composition
Race	Num.	Perc.
White (non-Hispanic)	1,468	78.13%
Black or African American (non-Hispanic)	346	18.41%
Native American	5	0.27%
Asian	1	0.05%
Pacific Islander	1	0.05%
Other/Mixed	49	2.61%
Hispanic or Latino	9	0.48%

As of the 2020 United States census, there were 1,879 people, 884 households, and 487 families residing in the city.

== Notable people ==
Sulligent is the birthplace of two former Auburn University All-SEC players: defensive back James McKinney and cousin running back Joe Cribbs. McKinney became Auburn's first African American football player to be named first-team All-SEC. Cribbs, a two-time All-SEC performer, a first-team All-American and SEC Player of the Year, was drafted in the 1980 NFL draft, becoming an NFL running back All-Pro and Rookie of the Year. Sulligent was the home to Rashad Johnson, a University of Alabama All-SEC and All-American safety, who was selected in the 2009 NFL draft. Sulligent is the home of former Major League Baseball player (from 1948 to 1951) Bubba Harris and former Negro league baseball player (from 1931 to 1951) Sam Bankhead. Sulligent was the childhood home of John H. Bankhead, a Confederate officer during the American Civil War and a Democratic U.S. Senator from 1907 until his death in 1920.
