= Lamar County, Alabama =

County in Alabama, United States

- County
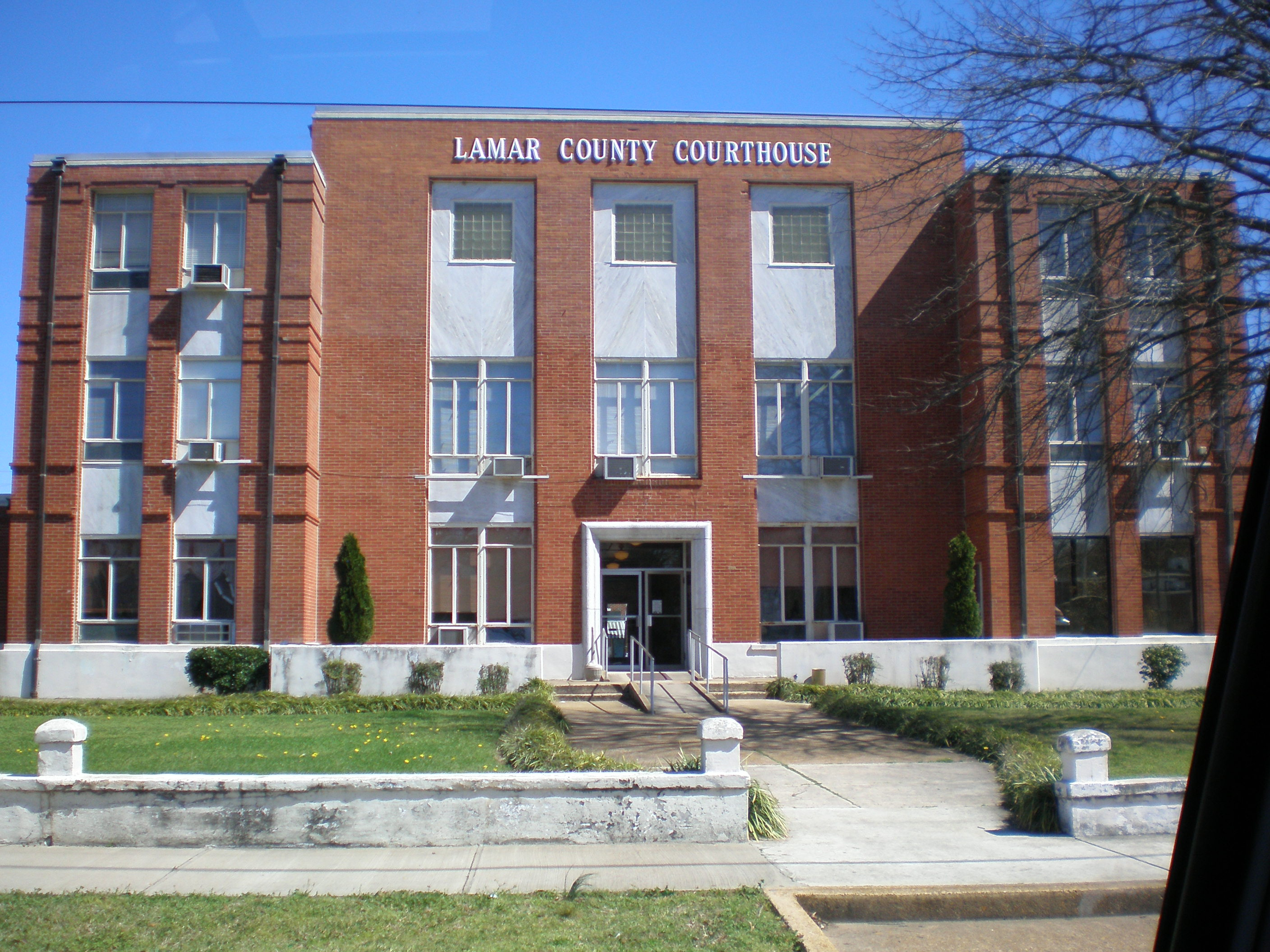
- Lamar County Courthouse in Vernon

- Location within the U.S. state of Alabama
- Coordinates: 33°46′50″N 88°05′47″W
- Country: United States
- State: Alabama
- Founded: February 8, 1877
- Named for: Lucius Quintus Cincinnatus Lamar
- Seat: Vernon
- Largest city: Vernon

Area
  - Total: 605 sq mi (1,570 km^{2})
  - Land: 605 sq mi (1,570 km^{2})
  - Water: 0.6 sq mi (1.6 km^{2}) 0.1%

Population (2020)
  - Total: 13,972
  - Estimate (2025): 13,587 ▼
  - Density: 23.1/sq mi (8.92/km^{2})
- Time zone: UTC−6 (Central)
  - Summer (DST): UTC−5 (CDT)
- Congressional district: 4th
- Website: lamarcountyal.gov
- County Number 40 on Alabama Licence Plates

Lamar County (formerly Jones County and Sanford County) is a county in the U.S. state of Alabama. As of the 2020 census, the population was 13,972. Its county seat is Vernon and it is a wet county. It is named in honor of Lucius Quintus Cincinnatus Lamar, a former Confederate officer and former member of both houses of the United States Congress from Mississippi.

== History ==
Jones County, Alabama was established on February 4, 1867, with land taken from the southern part of Marion County and the western part of Fayette County. It was named for E. P. Jones of Fayette County, with its county seat in Vernon. This county was abolished on November 13, 1867. On October 8, 1868, the area was again organized into a county, but as Covington County had been renamed "Jones County" the same year (a change that lasted only a few months), the new county was named Sanford, in honor of H. C. Sanford of Cherokee County. On February 8, 1877, the county was renamed Lamar in honor of Congressman and Senator L.Q.C. Lamar of Mississippi.

== Geography ==
According to the United States Census Bureau, the county has a total area of 605 square miles (1,570 km^{2}), of which 605 square miles (1,570 km^{2}) is land and 0.6 square miles (1.6 km^{2}) (0.1%) is water.

=== Adjacent counties ===
- Marion County (north)
- Fayette County (east)
- Pickens County (south)
- Lowndes County, Mississippi (southwest)
- Monroe County, Mississippi (west)

=== Cemeteries ===
- Asbury Methodist Church (2)
- Pine Springs Cemetery
- Blooming Grove Baptist Church Cemetery
- Christian Chapel Church of Christ Cemetery
- Fellowship Baptist Church Cemetery
- Furnace Hill Cemetery
- Kennedy Town Cemetery
- Liberty Baptist Church Cemetery
- Macedonia Baptist Church Cemetery
- Meadow Branch Baptist Church Cemetery
- Mount Olive Church of Christ Cemetery
- Mt. Pisgah Baptist Church Cemetery
- Old Mount Nebo Cemetery
- Shiloh (Pinhook) United Methodist Church Cemetery
- Sulligent City Cemetery
- Vernon City Cemetery
- Providence United Methodist Cemetery
- Union Chapel Church Cemetery near Crossville
- Morton Chapel Methodist Church Cemetery near Vernon
- Fairview Church Cemetery
- Lebanon United Methodist Church Cemetery
- Shiloh Baptist Church Cemetery
- Old Liberty Church Cemetery
- South Carolina Church Cemetery near Hightogy
- Springhill Cemetery near Millport
- Walnut Grove Cemetery
- Wesley Chapel Cemetery
- Glimer Addition to Sulligent City Cemetery
- Sandlin Cemetery (just north of Sulligent on Hwy 17)

== Demographics ==
Historical population
Census	Pop.	Note	%±
1870	8,893		—
1880	12,142		36.5%
1890	14,187		16.8%
1900	16,084		13.4%
1910	17,487		8.7%
1920	18,149		3.8%
1930	18,001		−0.8%
1940	19,708		9.5%
1950	16,441		−16.6%
1960	14,271		−13.2%
1970	14,335		0.4%
1980	16,453		14.8%
1990	15,715		−4.5%
2000	15,904		1.2%
2010	14,564		−8.4%
2020	13,972		−4.1%
2025 (est.)	13,587	▼	−2.8%
U.S. Decennial Census; 1790–1960 1900–1990; 1990–2000 2010–2020

=== 2020 census ===
As of the 2020 census, the county had a population of 13,972. The median age was 45.3 years. 21.1% of residents were under the age of 18 and 22.2% of residents were 65 years of age or older. For every 100 females there were 96.7 males, and for every 100 females age 18 and over there were 93.9 males age 18 and over.

The racial makeup of the county was 85.6% White, 10.2% Black or African American, 0.3% American Indian and Alaska Native, 0.0% Asian, 0.0% Native Hawaiian and Pacific Islander, 0.7% from some other race, and 3.2% from two or more races. Hispanic or Latino residents of any race comprised 1.5% of the population.

0.0% of residents lived in urban areas, while 100.0% lived in rural areas.

There were 5,958 households in the county, of which 27.6% had children under the age of 18 living with them and 28.3% had a female householder with no spouse or partner present. About 30.8% of all households were made up of individuals and 15.7% had someone living alone who was 65 years of age or older.

There were 7,071 housing units, of which 15.7% were vacant. Among occupied housing units, 74.0% were owner-occupied and 26.0% were renter-occupied. The homeowner vacancy rate was 1.4% and the rental vacancy rate was 12.7%.

=== Racial and ethnic composition ===
Lamar County, Alabama – Racial and ethnic composition Note: the US Census treats Hispanic/Latino as an ethnic category. This table excludes Latinos from the racial categories and assigns them to a separate category. Hispanics/Latinos may be of any race.
Race / Ethnicity (NH = Non-Hispanic)	Pop 2000	Pop 2010	Pop 2020	% 2000	% 2010	% 2020
White alone (NH)	13,695	12,542	11,924	86.11%	86.12%	85.34%
Black or African American alone (NH)	1,899	1,635	1,421	11.94%	11.23%	10.17%
Native American or Alaska Native alone (NH)	15	24	28	0.09%	0.16%	0.20%
Asian alone (NH)	9	4	6	0.06%	0.03%	0.04%
Pacific Islander alone (NH)	0	1	3	0.00%	0.01%	0.02%
Other race alone (NH)	2	4	22	0.01%	0.03%	0.16%
Mixed race or Multiracial (NH)	77	174	360	0.48%	1.19%	2.58%
Hispanic or Latino (any race)	207	180	208	1.30%	1.24%	1.49%
Total	15,904	14,564	13,972	100.00%	100.00%	100.00%

=== 2010 census ===
As of the census of 2010, there were 14,564 people, 6,103 households, and 4,207 families living in the county. The population density was 24 people per square mile (9.3 people/km^{2}). There were 7,354 housing units at an average density of 12 units per square mile (4.6 units/km^{2}). The racial makeup of the county was 86.7% White, 11.3% Black or African American, 0.2% Native American, 0.0% Asian, 0.6% from other races, and 1.3% from two or more races. 1.2% of the population were Hispanic or Latino of any race.

There were 6,103 households, out of which 26.1% had children under the age of 18 living with them, 53.2% were married couples living together, 11.6% had a female householder with no husband present, and 31.1% were non-families. 28.8% of all households were made up of individuals, and 13.3% had someone living alone who was 65 years of age or older. The average household size was 2.35 and the average family size was 2.8.

In the county, the population was spread out, with 22.2% under the age of 18, 7.2% from 18 to 24, 22.5% from 25 to 44, 29.3% from 45 to 64, and 18.8% who were 65 years of age or older. The median age was 43.5 years. For every 100 females, there were 95.0 males. For every 100 females age 18 and over, there were 99.4 males.

The median income for a household in the county was $33,887, and the median income for a family was $42,492. Males had a median income of $36,833 versus $25,125 for females. The per capita income for the county was $19,789. About 13.2% of families and 18.5% of the population were below the poverty line, including 25.2% of those under age 18 and 14.6% of those age 65 or over.

=== 2000 census ===
As of the census of 2000, there were 15,904 people, 6,468 households, and 4,715 families living in the county. The population density was 26 people per square mile (10 people/km^{2}). There were 7,517 housing units at an average density of 12 units per square mile (4.6 units/km^{2}). The racial makeup of the county was 86.87% White, 11.98% Black or African American, 0.11% Native American, 0.06% Asian, 0.46% from other races, and 0.51% from two or more races. 1.30% of the population were Hispanic or Latino of any race.

There were 6,468 households, out of which 31.40% had children under the age of 18 living with them, 58.60% were married couples living together, 10.90% had a female householder with no husband present, and 27.10% were non-families. 25.40% of all households were made up of individuals, and 12.10% had someone living alone who was 65 years of age or older. The average household size was 2.43 and the average family size was 2.89.

In the county, the population was spread out, with 23.60% under the age of 18, 8.70% from 18 to 24, 27.70% from 25 to 44, 24.10% from 45 to 64, and 15.90% who were 65 years of age or older. The median age was 38 years. For every 100 females, there were 93.40 males. For every 100 females age 18 and over, there were 90.90 males.

The median income for a household in the county was $28,059, and the median income for a family was $33,050. Males had a median income of $30,453 versus $18,947 for females. The per capita income for the county was $14,435. About 13.30% of families and 16.10% of the population were below the poverty line, including 19.10% of those under age 18 and 18.60% of those age 65 or over.

== Media ==
=== Newspapers ===
- The Vernon Pioneer - (1875–1878) The first newspaper published in Lamar County was The Vernon Pioneer. The Editors and Proprietors included William R. Smith, William R. Smith Jr., Smith, McCullough & Co, Sid B. Smith, and Don R. Aldridge.
- The Vernon Clipper - (1879–1880) - Alexander Cobb as Editor and Proprietor and later Alex A. Wall as Proprietor.
- The Lamar News - (1886–1887) - E. J. McNatt as Editor and Proprietor
- The Sulligent Lightning
- The Vernon Courier - (1886–1890) - Alex A. Wall as Editor and Publisher, then Courier Publishing Co. (R. J. Young as Editor-in-Chief and Mollie C. Young as partner)
- The Eagle-Eye (1894)
- The Lamar Democrat (1896–present)
- The Rural Educator (1908)
- The Sulligent News (1942–1952)

== Transportation ==
=== Major highways ===
- U.S. Highway 278 / State Route 118
- State Route 17
- State Route 18
- State Route 19
- State Route 96

=== Rail ===
- BNSF Railway
- Luxapalila Valley Railroad

== Politics ==
In a 2000 referendum to repeal Alabama's constitutional prohibition of interracial marriage, Lamar County voters showed the highest rate of opposition in the state, with 65.69% opposing repeal of the provision.

Since Ronald Reagan in 1984, Lamar County has been reliably Republican at the presidential level. The last Democrat to win the county in a presidential election is Jimmy Carter, who won it by a majority in 1980.

United States presidential election results for Lamar County, Alabama
Year	Republican		Democratic		Third party(ies)	
Year	No.	%	No.	%	No.	%
1880	172	16.73%	856	83.27%	0	0.00%
1884	234	22.03%	828	77.97%	0	0.00%
1888	243	17.65%	1,133	82.28%	1	0.07%
1892	31	1.49%	1,458	70.20%	588	28.31%
1896	509	27.32%	1,263	67.79%	91	4.88%
1900	509	35.06%	890	61.29%	53	3.65%
1904	215	19.98%	848	78.81%	13	1.21%
1908	160	15.84%	839	83.07%	11	1.09%
1912	61	5.83%	816	77.94%	170	16.24%
1916	303	18.53%	1,299	79.45%	33	2.02%
1920	576	25.95%	1,628	73.33%	16	0.72%
1924	262	19.14%	1,087	79.40%	20	1.46%
1928	804	36.28%	1,412	63.72%	0	0.00%
1932	258	10.43%	2,207	89.24%	8	0.32%
1936	195	7.52%	2,393	92.25%	6	0.23%
1940	275	9.32%	2,665	90.28%	12	0.41%
1944	310	13.18%	2,025	86.10%	17	0.72%
1948	180	11.10%	0	0.00%	1,442	88.90%
1952	605	19.40%	2,512	80.56%	1	0.03%
1956	867	25.51%	2,501	73.58%	31	0.91%
1960	964	28.43%	2,386	70.36%	41	1.21%
1964	2,734	72.42%	0	0.00%	1,041	27.58%
1968	364	6.14%	302	5.10%	5,259	88.76%
1972	3,283	80.56%	766	18.80%	26	0.64%
1976	1,739	30.38%	3,860	67.44%	125	2.18%
1980	2,778	44.91%	3,366	54.41%	42	0.68%
1984	3,943	67.21%	1,910	32.55%	14	0.24%
1988	3,214	58.48%	2,274	41.38%	8	0.15%
1992	3,262	47.29%	2,849	41.30%	787	11.41%
1996	2,955	46.10%	2,843	44.35%	612	9.55%
2000	4,470	61.66%	2,653	36.60%	126	1.74%
2004	4,894	71.08%	1,956	28.41%	35	0.51%
2008	5,419	76.59%	1,614	22.81%	42	0.59%
2012	5,457	76.05%	1,646	22.94%	73	1.02%
2016	5,823	83.59%	1,036	14.87%	107	1.54%
2020	6,174	85.83%	978	13.60%	41	0.57%
2024	6,033	87.56%	806	11.70%	51	0.74%

United States Senate election results for Lamar County, Alabama2
Year	Republican		Democratic		Third party(ies)	
Year	No.	%	No.	%	No.	%
2020	6,088	85.00%	1,071	14.95%	3	0.04%

United States Senate election results for Lamar County, Alabama3
Year	Republican		Democratic		Third party(ies)	
Year	No.	%	No.	%	No.	%
2022	3,869	88.41%	447	10.21%	60	1.37%

Alabama Gubernatorial election results for Lamar County
Year	Republican		Democratic		Third party(ies)	
Year	No.	%	No.	%	No.	%
2022	3,831	87.51%	415	9.48%	132	3.02%

== Communities ==
=== Cities ===
- Sulligent
- Vernon (county seat)

=== Towns ===
- Beaverton
- Detroit
- Kennedy
- Millport

=== Unincorporated communities ===
- Crews
- Fernbank
- Henson Springs
- Hightogy
- Kingville
- Moscow

== Education ==
There is one school district in the county, Lamar County School District.

== See also ==
- National Register of Historic Places listings in Lamar County, Alabama
- Properties on the Alabama Register of Landmarks and Heritage in Lamar County, Alabama
