= List of places in Alabama: A–C =

This is a list of current cities, towns, unincorporated communities, counties, and other recognized places in the U.S. state of Alabama, with information on the number of counties in which the place lies, the name of its principal county, and its lower and upper ZIP Code bounds, if applicable.

== See also ==
- Alabama
- List of cities in Alabama
- List of counties in Alabama

== A ==
Name of place	Number of counties	Principal county	Lower zip code	Upper zip code
Abanda	1	Chambers County	36276	
Abbeville	1	Henry County	36310	
Abbot Springs	1	Shelby County	35147	
Abel	1	Cleburne County	36258	
Abercrombie	1	Bibb County	35042	
Aberfoil	1	Bullock County	36089	
Abernant	1	Tuscaloosa County	35440	
Abernathy	1	Cleburne County	36264	
Acipcoville	1	Jefferson County	35207	
Ackerville	1	Wilcox County	36768	
Acmar	1	St. Clair County	35004	
Active	1	Bibb County	36793	
Acton	1	Jefferson County	35243	
Acton	1	Shelby County	35244	
Ada	1	Montgomery County	36069	
Adair Ford	1	Madison County		
Adams	1	Chilton County		
Adams	1	Mobile County		
Adamsburg	1	DeKalb County	35967	
Adams Crossroads	1	Cherokee County		
Adamsville	1	Jefferson County	35005	
Addison	1	Winston County	35540	
Aden	1	Shelby County		
Adger	1	Jefferson County	35006	
Adkin Hill	1	Elmore County		
Adler	1	Perry County	36779	
Adville	1	Blount County		
Ai	1	Cleburne County	36264	
Aigleville	1	Marengo County		
Aimwell	1	Marengo County	36782	
Airport Highlands	1	Jefferson County	35206	
Akinsville	1	Barbour County		
Akka	1	Mobile County		
Akron	1	Hale County	35441	
Alabama Army Ammunition Plant	1	Talladega County	35044	
Alabama City	1	Etowah County	35904	
Alabama Fork	1	Limestone County		
Alabama Home Spur	1	Tuscaloosa County		
Alabama Ordnance Works	1	Talladega County		
Alabama Port	1	Mobile County	36523	
Alabama Shores	1	Colbert County	35661	
Alabaster	1	Shelby County	35007	
Alaga	1	Houston County		
Alamet	1	Dallas County		
Albany	1	Morgan County		
Alberta	1	Wilcox County	36720	
Alberta City	1	Tuscaloosa County	35404	
Alberton	1	Coffee County	36453	
Albertville	1	Marshall County	35950	
Alco	1	Escambia County		
Alden	1	Jefferson County	35073	
Alder Springs	1	Marshall County	35950	
Aldrich	1	Shelby County	35115	
Aldridge	1	Walker County	35580	
Aldridge Grove	1	Lawrence County	35650	
Alexander City	1	Tallapoosa County	35010	
Alexander Heights	1	Lauderdale County	35633	
Alexandria	1	Calhoun County	36250	
Alexis	1	Cherokee County	35960	
Alfalfa	1	Marengo County		
Aliceville	1	Pickens County	35442	
Allen	1	Clarke County	36419	
Allens Crossroads	1	Marshall County	35175	
Allenton	1	Wilcox County	36768	
Allenville	1	Hale County	36738	
Allenville	1	Marengo County	36738	
Allenville	1	Mobile County		
Allgood	1	Blount County	35013	
Alliance	1	Macon County		
Allison	1	Greene County		
Allison	1	Jackson County		
Allison Mills	1	Talladega County		
Allsboro	1	Colbert County	35616	
Allsop	1	Calhoun County		
Alma	1	Clarke County	36501	
Almeria	1	Bullock County	36089	
Almond	1	Randolph County	36276	
Almont	1	Shelby County		
Alpha Springs	1	Chilton County		
Alpine	1	Talladega County	35014	
Alred	1	Pike County		
Alta	1	Fayette County		
Altadena Valley	1	Jefferson County	35243	
Altamont Park	1	Jefferson County		
Alton	1	Jefferson County	35015	
Altoona	2	Blount County	35952	
Altoona	2	Etowah County	35952	
Ambersonville	1	Cherokee County		
America	1	Walker County	35580	
Andalusia	1	Covington County	36420	
Anderson	1	Etowah County	35901	
Anderson	1	Lauderdale County	35610	
Andrews Chapel	1	Morgan County	35619	
Angel	1	Calhoun County	36265	
Anita	1	Shelby County		
Anne Manie	1	Wilcox County	36721	
Anniston	1	Calhoun County	36203	06
Anniston Army Depot	1	Calhoun County	36203	
Anniston-Calhoun County Airport	1	Calhoun County	36203	
Anniston Northwest	1	Calhoun County	36203	
Ansley	1	Pike County	36081	
Antioch	1	Bibb County		
Antioch	1	Calhoun County	36260	
Antioch	1	Cherokee County		
Antioch	1	Clarke County		
Antioch	1	Covington County	36420	
Antioch	1	Lauderdale County		
Antioch	1	Pike County	36081	
Apple Grove	1	Morgan County		
Appleton	1	Escambia County	36426	
Aqua Vista	1	Lauderdale County	35645	
Aquilla	1	Choctaw County	36558	
Arab	2	Cullman County	35016	
Arab	2	Marshall County	35016	
Ararat	1	Choctaw County	36921	
Arbacoochee	1	Cleburne County	36264	
Arbor Acres	1	Madison County		
Arcola	1	Hale County		
Ardell	1	Cullman County	35053	
Ardilla	1	Houston County	36303	
Ardmore	1	Limestone County	35739	
Ardmore Highway	1	Madison County	35805	
Argo	2	Jefferson County	35173	
Argo	2	St. Clair County	35173	
Argo	1	Walker County		
Argo Heights	1	Walker County	35550	
Arguta	1	Dale County	36360	
Ariton	1	Dale County	36311	
Arkadelphia	1	Cullman County	35033	
Arkdell	1	Lauderdale County		
Arkwright	1	Shelby County	35178	
Arley	1	Winston County	35541	
Arlington	1	Wilcox County	36722	
Armstead	1	Blount County	35121	
Armstrong	1	Macon County	36089	
Arona	1	DeKalb County	35957	
Arrowhead	1	Montgomery County	36109	
Arrowwood	1	Tuscaloosa County		
Asahel	1	Wilcox County		
Asberry	1	Calhoun County		
Asbury	1	Dale County	36360	
Asbury	1	Marshall County	35950	
Ashbank	1	Winston County	35578	
Ashby	1	Bibb County	35035	
Ashford	1	Houston County	36312	
Ashland	1	Clay County	36251	
Ashridge	1	Winston County	35565	
Ashville	1	St. Clair County	35953	
Askea Grove	1	Marshall County		
Aspel	1	Jackson County	35768	
Athens	1	Limestone County	35611	
Atkinson	1	Clarke County	36784	
Atmore	1	Escambia County	36502	
Attalla	1	Etowah County	35954	
Atwood	1	Franklin County	35571	
Aubrey	1	Lee County		
Auburn	1	Lee County	36830	
Augustin	1	Perry County	36701	
Aurora	1	Etowah County	35957	
Aurora Springs	1	Colbert County	35616	
Austin	1	Pickens County		
Austinville	1	Morgan County	35601	
Autaugaville	1	Autauga County	36003	
Ava	1	Randolph County		
Avalon Park	1	Jefferson County	35020	
Avant	1	Butler County	36033	
Avery	1	Jackson County	35772	
Avery	1	Shelby County		
Avoca	1	Lawrence County	35653	
Avon	1	Houston County	36312	
Avondale	1	Jefferson County	35222	
Avondale Village	1	St. Clair County	35125	
Avon Park	1	Jefferson County		
Awin	1	Wilcox County	36768	
Axis	1	Mobile County	36505	
Axle	1	Monroe County		
Ayres	1	Jefferson County	35126	

== B ==
Name of place	Number of counties	Principal county	Lower zip code	Upper zip code
Babbie	1	Covington County	36420	
Baccus	1	Marion County		
Bacon Level	1	Randolph County	36274	
Bagley	1	Jefferson County	35062	
Bailey Cove Estates	1	Madison County		
Bailey Crossroads	1	Geneva County		
Baileys Mill	1	Cullman County		
Bailey Springs	1	Lauderdale County		
Baileyton	1	Cullman County	35019	
Baileytown	1	Jackson County		
Bakerhill	1	Barbour County	36027	
Bald Hill	1	Geneva County	36375	
Baldwin	1	Cullman County		
Baldwin Farms	1	Macon County	36039	
Balkum	1	Henry County	36345	
Ball Flat	1	Cherokee County		
Ballistics Missile Defense Advanced Technical Ctr.	1	Madison County	35805	
Ballplay	1	Etowah County	35901	
Baltic	1	Pike County		
Baltimore Hill	1	Madison County		
Bama	1	Talladega County		
Bamford	1	Shelby County		
Bangor	1	Blount County	35079	
Bankhead	1	DeKalb County	35984	
Bankhead	1	Walker County	35580	
Banks	1	Pike County	36005	
Bankston	1	Fayette County	35542	
Barachias	1	Montgomery County	36064	
Barber	1	Houston County	36312	
Barclay	1	Talladega County		
Barefield Crossroads	1	Dale County		
Barfield	1	Clay County	36266	
Barlow	1	Washington County	36558	
Barlow Bend	1	Clarke County	36545	
Barnes	1	Dale County		
Barnes	1	Henry County		
Barnesville	1	Marion County	35570	
Barnett Chapel	1	Winston County	35572	
Barnett Crossroads	1	Escambia County	36426	
Barney	1	Walker County	35550	
Barnisdale Forest	1	Jefferson County		
Barnwell	1	Baldwin County	36532	
Barrett	1	Houston County		
Barrett Crossroads	1	Randolph County		
Barry	1	Mobile County		
Barrytown	1	Choctaw County	36908	
Barton	1	Colbert County	35616	
Bartonville	1	Jefferson County	35217	
Basham	1	Morgan County	35640	
Bashi	1	Clarke County	36784	
Bashi	1	Washington County		
Basin	1	Coffee County	36323	
Bass	1	Jackson County	35772	
Bassetts Creek	1	Washington County	36585	
Bates Field	1	Mobile County	36608	
Batesville	1	Barbour County	36018	
Bath Springs	1	Etowah County		
Battelle	1	DeKalb County		
Battens Crossroads	1	Coffee County	36316	
Battery Hill	1	Jackson County		
Battleground	1	Cullman County	35179	
Battles Wharf	1	Baldwin County	36532	
Baxters	1	Barbour County		
Bayleys Corner	1	Mobile County		
Bay Minette	1	Baldwin County	36507	
Bayou La Batre	1	Mobile County	36509	
Bayside	1	Morgan County		
Bay Springs	1	Cherokee County	35960	
Bayview	1	Jefferson County	35005	
Bazemore	1	Fayette County	35559	
Beachwood Park	1	Jefferson County		
Beamon	1	Dale County	36360	
Bean Rock	1	Marshall County	35175	
Beans Crossroads	1	Bullock County		
Beans Mill	1	Lee County		
Bear Creek	1	Marion County	35543	
Beards Mill	1	Pickens County		
Beasley	1	Pickens County		
Beasons Mill	1	Cleburne County	36264	
Beatrice	1	Monroe County	36425	
Beaty Crossroads	1	DeKalb County	35978	
Beaverton	1	Lamar County	35544	
Beaver Town	1	Pickens County	35442	
Beck	1	Covington County	36420	
Beda	1	Covington County		
Beechwood	1	Lowndes County		
Beehive	1	Lee County		
Bel Air	1	Jefferson County		
Bel Air	1	Mobile County	36616	
Belchers	1	Bibb County		
Belforest	1	Baldwin County	36526	
Belfountain	1	Baldwin County	32533	
Belgreen	1	Franklin County	35653	
Belk	1	Fayette County	35545	
Belknap	1	Dallas County		
Bell	1	Pickens County		
Bellamy	1	Sumter County	36901	
Belle Ellen	1	Bibb County		
Belle Fontaine	1	Mobile County	36582	
Bellefonte	1	Jackson County	35752	
Belle Haven	1	Jefferson County		
Bellemeade	1	Lauderdale County		
Belle Mina	1	Limestone County	35615	
Belleville	1	Conecuh County	36475	
Bellevue	1	Dallas County		
Bellevue	1	Etowah County	35901	
Bell Factory	1	Madison County		
Bell Mills	1	Cleburne County		
Bells Crossroads	1	Barbour County		
Bells Crossroads	1	Dale County		
Bell Springs	1	Morgan County	35622	
Belltown	1	Cleburne County		
Bellview	1	Jackson County		
Bellview	1	Wilcox County	36481	
Bellwood	1	Geneva County	36313	
Bellwood	1	Jefferson County	35064	
Belmont	1	Sumter County	35450	
Beloit	1	Dallas County	36759	
Beltline	1	Morgan County	35601	
Beltona	1	Jefferson County		
Belview Heights	1	Colbert County	35674	
Belwood	1	Jefferson County		
Bemiston	1	Talladega County	35160	
Bendale	1	Jefferson County		
Benevola	1	Pickens County	35466	
Benoit	1	Walker County	35550	
Benson	1	Chilton County		
Bentley Hills	1	Jefferson County	35223	
Bentleyville	1	Coosa County		
Benton	1	Lowndes County	36785	
Ben Vines Gap	1	Jefferson County	35118	
Bergens	1	Walker County		
Berkley	1	Madison County	35748	
Berkley Hills	1	Jefferson County		
Berlin	1	Cullman County	35055	
Berlin	1	Dallas County		
Bermuda	1	Conecuh County	36401	
Bermuda	1	Monroe County	36460	
Berney Points	1	Jefferson County		
Berneys	1	Talladega County		
Berry	1	Fayette County	35546	
Berry Springs	1	Cherokee County		
Bertha	1	Dale County	36353	
Berwick	1	Clay County		
Bessemer	1	Jefferson County	35020	
Bessemer Gardens	1	Jefferson County	35023	
Bessemer Homestead	1	Jefferson County	35023	
Bessemer Junction	1	Jefferson County		
Bessie	1	Chilton County		
Bessie	1	Jefferson County		
Bessie Junction	1	Jefferson County		
Bethany	1	Tuscaloosa County	35452	
Bethel	1	Barbour County		
Bethel	1	Conecuh County		
Bethel	1	Cullman County	35055	
Bethel	1	Limestone County	35620	
Bethel	1	Wilcox County		
Bethel Grove	1	Autauga County	36749	
Bethlehem	1	Montgomery County	36046	
Beulah	1	Covington County	36467	
Beulah	1	Greene County	35469	
Beulah	1	Lee County	36872	
Beulah Land	1	Limestone County		
Bevelle	1	Tallapoosa County	35010	
Beverly Station	1	Jefferson County		
Bexar	1	Marion County	35570	
Bibb Mill	1	Bibb County		
Bibbville	1	Bibb County	35188	
Biddle Crossroads	1	DeKalb County	35978	
Bigbee	1	Washington County	36510	
Big Creek	1	Houston County	36303	
Big Oak	1	Lauderdale County		
Big Ridge	1	Walker County		
Big Springs	1	Bibb County	35188	
Big Springs	1	Randolph County		
Billingsley	1	Autauga County	36006	
Billingsly	1	Autauga County	36006	
Billy Goat Hill	1	Cherokee County	35960	
Bingham	1	Colbert County		
Birdeye	1	Greene County		
Birdine	1	Greene County	36740	
Birdsong	1	Cullman County	35055	
Birmingham	2	Jefferson County	35201	61
Birmingham	2	Shelby County	35201	61
Birmingham Municipal Airport	1	Jefferson County	35212	
Birminghamport	1	Jefferson County		
Birwat	1	Jefferson County		
Biscayne Highlands	1	Jefferson County		
Bishop	1	Colbert County	35616	
Biven	1	Jefferson County	35214	
Black	1	Geneva County	36314	
Blackankle	1	Jackson County		
Black Bottom	1	Cullman County		
Blackburn	1	Lauderdale County		
Blackburn	1	Limestone County		
Black Creek	1	Jefferson County		
Black Diamond	1	Jefferson County	35023	
Blackman	1	Chambers County		
Black Pond	1	Winston County		
Black Rock	1	Crenshaw County	36071	
Blacks Bluff	1	Wilcox County		
Blacksher	1	Baldwin County	36507	
Blackwood	1	Henry County	36345	
Bladon Springs	1	Choctaw County	36919	
Blairs	1	Covington County		
Blakeley	1	Baldwin County		
Blakely	1	Mobile County		
Blalock	1	Dallas County		
Blanche	1	Cherokee County	35973	
Blanton	1	Lee County	36872	
Bleecker	1	Lee County	36874	
Blocton	1	Bibb County		
Blocton Junction	1	Bibb County		
Blossburg	1	Jefferson County	35073	
Bloucher Ford	1	Madison County		
Blount Springs	1	Blount County	35079	
Blountsville	1	Blount County	35031	
Blow Gourd	1	Blount County	35049	
Blue Creek	1	Jefferson County	35023	
Blue Creek Junction	1	Jefferson County	35023	
Blue Mountain	1	Calhoun County	36204	
Blue Pond	1	Cherokee County	35959	
Blue Ridge	1	Elmore County		
Blue Ridge Estates	1	Jefferson County	35216	
Blues Old Stand	1	Bullock County	36061	
Blue Spring	1	Madison County	35810	
Blue Springs	1	Barbour County	36017	
Blue Springs	1	Blount County	35031	
Blue Springs	1	Coosa County		
Blue Springs	1	Covington County	36467	
Bluff	1	Fayette County	35555	
Bluff City	1	Morgan County		
Bluff Park	1	Jefferson County	35226	
Bluffport	1	Sumter County		
Bluff Springs	1	Clay County	36251	
Bluff Springs	1	Coffee County	36323	
Bluffton	1	Cherokee County	30138	
Boar Tush	1	Winston County	35565	
Boaz	2	Etowah County	35957	
Boaz	2	Marshall County	35957	
Bobo	1	Fayette County	35594	
Bobo	1	Madison County	35773	
Bogue Chitto	1	Dallas County		
Bogueloosa	1	Choctaw County		
Bohannon Ford	1	DeKalb County		
Boiling Springs	1	Calhoun County	36271	
Boldo	1	Walker County	35501	
Boley Springs	1	Fayette County	35546	
Boligee	1	Greene County	35443	
Bolinger	1	Choctaw County	36903	
Bolivar	1	Jackson County	35740	
Bolling	1	Butler County	36033	
Bomar	1	Cherokee County	35960	
Bon-Air	1	Jefferson County	35023	
Bon Air	1	Talladega County	35032	
Bonita	1	Autauga County		
Bonneville	1	Limestone County		
Bonnie Doone	1	Limestone County		
Bonny Brook	1	Calhoun County		
Bon Secour	1	Baldwin County	36511	
Booker Heights	1	Jefferson County		
Bookers Mill	1	Conecuh County		
Booneville	1	Escambia County		
Booth	1	Autauga County	36008	
Booth Ford	1	Shelby County		
Boot Hill	1	Pike County	36048	
Boothton	1	Shelby County		
Boozer Heights	1	Calhoun County	36203	
Borden Springs	1	Cleburne County	36262	
Borden Wheeler Springs	1	Cleburne County	36262	
Borom	1	Macon County	36860	
Boromville	1	Macon County	36860	
Boston	1	Marion County	35548	
Boswell	1	Bullock County	36081	
Bosworth	1	Chambers County		
Bowden Grove	1	Clay County		
Bowles	1	Conecuh County	36401	
Bowman Crossroads	1	Jackson County		
Bowmans Crossroads	1	DeKalb County	35744	
Boyd	1	Sumter County	35470	
Boyd Crossing	1	Tuscaloosa County	35490	
Boyds	1	Chambers County		
Boyds Tank	1	Chambers County		
Boykin	1	Covington County		
Boykin	1	Escambia County	36426	
Boykin	1	Wilcox County	36723	
Boyles	1	Jefferson County		
Boyles Highlands	1	Jefferson County		
Boylston	1	Montgomery County	36110	
Boys Ranch	1	Dallas County	36761	
Bradford	1	Coosa County	35089	
Bradford	1	Jefferson County		
Bradley	1	Escambia County	36483	
Bradleyton	1	Crenshaw County	36041	
Bradleytown	1	Walker County		
Braggs	1	Lowndes County	36761	
Braggsville	1	St. Clair County		
Braggville	1	Greene County		
Branchville	1	St. Clair County	35120	
Brandontown	1	Madison County	35805	
Brannon Springs	1	Etowah County	36271	
Brannon Stand	1	Houston County	36303	
Brantley	1	Crenshaw County	36009	
Brantley	1	Dallas County	36701	
Brantley Crossing	1	Conecuh County		
Brantleyville	1	Shelby County	35114	
Brassell	1	Montgomery County	36064	
Brassell Bottom	1	Montgomery County		
Bremen	1	Cullman County	35033	
Brent	1	Bibb County	35034	
Brentwood Hills	1	Jefferson County	35216	
Brewersville	1	Sumter County	35450	
Brewton	1	Escambia County	36426	
Briar Hill	1	Pike County	36035	
Brice	1	Etowah County		
Brick	1	Colbert County	35661	
Brickhouse Ford	1	Lawrence County		
Brickyard Junction	1	Jefferson County		
Brides Hill	1	Lawrence County		
Bridgehead	1	Baldwin County		
Bridgeport	1	Jackson County	35740	
Bridgeville	1	Pickens County		
Bridlewood Forest Estates	1	Jefferson County	35215	
Brierfield	1	Bibb County	35035	
Brighton	1	Jefferson County	35020	
Bright Star	1	Blount County		
Brilliant	1	Marion County	35548	
Brisco Store	1	Jackson County	35772	
Bristow	1	Cherokee County		
Broach Mill	1	Macon County		
Broadmoor	1	Jefferson County	35023	
Broadwells Mill	1	Calhoun County		
Bromley	1	Baldwin County	36507	
Brompton	1	St. Clair County	35094	
Brookhurst	1	Jefferson County		
Brookhurst	1	Madison County		
Brookland	1	Coffee County	36453	
Brooklane Place	1	Jefferson County		
Brookley	1	Mobile County		
Brooklyn	1	Coffee County	36467	
Brooklyn	1	Conecuh County	36429	
Brooklyn	1	Cullman County	35083	
Brooks	1	Covington County	36456	
Brooks Acres	1	Lauderdale County		
Brooks Crossroads	1	DeKalb County		
Brookside	1	Jefferson County	35036	
Brookside	1	Marion County		
Brooksville	1	Blount County	35031	
Brooksville	1	Morgan County	35670	
Brookwood	1	Tuscaloosa County	35444	
Brookwood Forest	1	Limestone County	35611	
Broomtown	1	Cherokee County	35973	
Broughton	1	Randolph County	36274	
Browns	1	Dallas County	36759	
Brownsboro	1	Madison County	35741	
Browns Corner	1	Madison County	35773	
Browns Crossroad	1	Henry County		
Browns Crossroads	1	Dale County	36360	
Brownson	1	Talladega County		
Brownstown	1	Sumter County		
Brownsville	1	Clay County		
Browntown	1	Jackson County	35978	
Browntown	1	Walker County		
Brownville	1	Clay County	35072	
Brownville	1	Conecuh County	36401	
Brownville	1	Jefferson County	36020	
Brownville	1	Tuscaloosa County	35476	
Bruceville	1	Bullock County	36089	
Brundidge	1	Pike County	36010	
Brunnet Heights	1	Jefferson County	35217	
Brushy Creek	1	Butler County		
Brushy Pond	1	Cullman County		
Bryan	1	Walker County		
Bryant	1	Jackson County	35958	
Buchanan Peninsula	1	Colbert County	35616	
Buck Creek	1	Tallapoosa County		
Buck Ford	1	Marshall County		
Buckhorn	1	Madison County	35761	
Buckhorn	1	Pike County	36005	
Bucks	1	Mobile County	36512	
Bucks Mill	1	Madison County		
Bucksnort	1	Marshall County	35747	
Bucksville	1	Tuscaloosa County		
Buckville	1	Tallapoosa County		
Buena Vista	1	Monroe County	36425	
Buena Vista Highlands	1	Jefferson County	35229	
Buffalo	1	Chambers County	36862	
Buggs Chapel	1	Madison County	35763	
Buhl	1	Tuscaloosa County	35446	
Bulgers	1	Tallapoosa County		
Bull City	1	Tuscaloosa County		
Bullock	1	Crenshaw County	36009	
Burbank	1	Washington County		
Burchfield	1	Tuscaloosa County	35483	
Burgess	1	Cherokee County		
Burgreen Corners	1	Limestone County	35758	
Burgreen Gin	1	Limestone County		
Burkeville	1	Lowndes County		
Burks Gardens	1	Tuscaloosa County	35404	
Burkville	1	Lowndes County	36752	
Burl	1	Wilcox County	36753	
Burlington	1	Elmore County	36078	
Burningtree Estates	1	Morgan County		
Burningtree Mountain	1	Morgan County		
Burns	1	Calhoun County	36272	
Burns Crossroad	1	Calhoun County		
Burnstown	1	Colbert County		
Burnsville	1	Dallas County	36701	
Burnt Corn	2	Conecuh County	36431	
Burnt Corn	2	Monroe County	36431	
Burntout	1	Franklin County	35593	
Burnwell	1	Walker County	35038	
Burrows	1	Madison County		
Burrows Crossroads	1	Walker County		
Burstall	1	Jefferson County		
Bush	1	Calhoun County		
Bush	1	Jefferson County		
Bushy Creek	1	Butler County	36033	
Bushy Pond	1	Cullman County	35033	
Butler	1	Choctaw County	36904	
Butler Mill	1	Madison County		
Butler Springs	1	Butler County	36030	
Butts Mill	1	Elmore County		
Buttston	1	Tallapoosa County	36853	
Buyck	1	Elmore County	36080	
Bynum	1	Calhoun County	36253	
Byrd	1	Marion County		

== C ==
Name of place	Number of counties	Principal county	Lower zip code	Upper zip code
Caddo	1	Lawrence County	35673	
Caffee Junction	1	Tuscaloosa County	35111	
Cahaba	1	Dallas County	36767	
Cahaba Crest	1	Jefferson County	35173	
Cahaba Heights	1	Jefferson County	35243	
Cahaba Hills	1	Jefferson County	35094	
Cahaba River Estates	1	Shelby County	35023	
Cairo	1	Limestone County		
Calcis	1	Shelby County	35178	
Caldwell	1	St. Clair County	35146	
Calebee	1	Macon County		
Caledonia	1	Wilcox County	36753	
Calera	2	Shelby County	35040	
Calera	2	Chilton County	35040	
Calhoun	1	Lowndes County	36047	
Calumet	1	Walker County	35580	
Calvary	1	Marengo County		
Calvert	1	Washington County	36513	
Camden	1	Wilcox County	36726	
Camden Junction	1	Monroe County		
Camelot	1	Madison County		
Cameron	1	Walker County		
Cameronsville	1	Jackson County	35772	
Campbell	1	Chilton County		
Campbell	1	Clarke County	36727	
Campbell Mill	1	Marshall County		
Campbells Crossroads	1	Clay County	36266	
Campbell Springs	1	Clay County		
Campbellville	1	Walker County	35063	
Camp Hill	1	Tallapoosa County	36850	
Camp Horne	1	Shelby County		
Camp McClellan	1	Calhoun County		
Camp Oliver	1	Jefferson County	35130	
Camp Rucker	2	Coffee County	36362	
Camp Rucker	2	Dale County	36362	
Canaan	1	Montgomery County		
Canoe	1	Escambia County	36502	
Cantebury Heights	1	Mobile County		
Cantelous	1	Montgomery County		
Cantelous Spur	1	Montgomery County		
Canton Bend	1	Wilcox County	36726	
Canty	1	Montgomery County		
Capell	1	Wilcox County	36726	
Capitol Heights	1	Montgomery County	36107	
Capps	1	Henry County	36353	
Capshaw	1	Limestone County	35742	
Carara	1	Talladega County		
Carbon Hill	1	Walker County	35549	
Cardiff	1	Jefferson County	35041	
Card Switch	1	Jackson County		
Carey	1	Limestone County		
Carleys	1	Wilcox County		
Carlisle	1	Etowah County	35957	
Carlowville	1	Dallas County	36761	
Carlton	1	Clarke County	36515	
Carmen	1	Crenshaw County		
Carney	1	Baldwin County		
Carns	1	Jackson County	35746	
Carolina	1	Covington County	36420	
Caroline Avenue	1	Mobile County	36604	
Carolyn	1	Montgomery County	36106	
Carpenter	1	Baldwin County	36507	
Carpenter	1	Washington County		
Carriger	1	Limestone County	35611	
Carr Mill	1	Clay County	36251	
Carroll Crossroads	1	Franklin County		
Carrollton	1	Pickens County	35447	
Carrville	1	Tallapoosa County	36078	
Carson	1	Washington County	36548	
Carter Grove	1	Madison County	35750	
Carters Hill	1	Montgomery County		
Cartwright	1	Limestone County	35620	
Carver Court	1	Macon County	36088	
Casemore	1	Hale County	36742	
Casey	1	Dallas County	36701	
Castleberry	1	Conecuh County	36432	
Caswell	1	Baldwin County		
Catalpa	1	Pike County	36081	
Catherine	1	Wilcox County	36728	
Catoma	1	Montgomery County	36108	
Cavalry Hill	1	Madison County		
Cave Spring	1	Colbert County	35674	
Cave Spring	1	Jackson County		
Cave Spring	1	Madison County	35763	
Cave Springs	1	Colbert County	35674	
Cave Springs	1	Etowah County	35954	
Cawthon	1	Covington County		
Cecil	1	Montgomery County	36013	
Cedar Bend	1	Etowah County		
Cedar Bluff	1	Cherokee County	35959	
Cedar Cove	1	Tuscaloosa County	35453	
Cedar Fork	1	Clarke County	36482	
Cedar Grove	1	Baldwin County		
Cedar Grove	1	Covington County	36420	
Cedar Grove	1	Jackson County	35772	
Cedar Grove	1	Lauderdale County		
Cedar Hill	1	Fayette County	35555	
Cedar Hill	1	Limestone County	38449	
Cedar Hills Estates	1	Colbert County	35674	
Cedar Lake	1	Morgan County	35601	
Cedar Plains	1	Morgan County	35622	
Cedar Point	1	Madison County	35760	
Cedar Springs	1	Blount County		
Cedar Springs	1	Calhoun County	36265	
Cedarville	1	Hale County		
Cedrum	1	Walker County		
Centenary	1	Crenshaw County		
Center	1	Winston County	35565	
Center Community	1	Cullman County		
Centercrest	1	Jefferson County	35215	
Center Dale	1	Morgan County		
Center Grove	1	Morgan County	35670	
Center Hill	1	Chilton County		
Center Hill	1	Cullman County	35077	
Center Hill	1	Lauderdale County	35648	
Center Hill	1	Limestone County	35773	
Center Point	1	Clarke County	36524	
Center Point	1	Jefferson County	35220	
Center Point Gardens	1	Jefferson County	35215	
Center Ridge	1	Crenshaw County		
Center Springs	1	Blount County	35172	
Center Star	1	Lauderdale County	35645	
Centerville	1	Conecuh County	36401	
Centerville	1	Cullman County		
Centerwood Estates	1	Jefferson County	35215	
Central	1	Cullman County	35055	
Central	1	Elmore County	36024	
Central	1	Jackson County		
Centrala	1	Greene County		
Central City	1	Coffee County	36330	
Central Crossroads	1	Jackson County	35978	
Central Heights	1	Lauderdale County	35633	
Central Highlands	1	Jefferson County		
Central Mills	1	Dallas County	36773	
Central Park Highlands	1	Jefferson County		
Centre	1	Cherokee County	35960	
Centreville	1	Bibb County	35042	
Ceramic	1	Russell County	36867	
Chalkville	1	Jefferson County	35215	
Chalybeate Springs	1	Lawrence County	35643	
Chambers	1	Tuscaloosa County		
Chambers Springs	1	Clay County		
Chamblees Mill	1	Blount County		
Champion	1	Blount County	35121	
Chance	1	Clarke County	36751	
Chancellor	1	Geneva County	36316	
Chancellor Crossroads	1	Shelby County		
Chances Crossroad	1	Cullman County		
Chandler Springs	1	Talladega County	35160	
Chapel Hill	1	Chambers County	36862	
Chapel Hill	1	Choctaw County		
Chapel Hill	1	Jefferson County	35216	
Chapel Hill	1	Walker County		
Chapel Hill	1	Washington County		
Chapman	1	Butler County	36015	
Chapman Heights	1	Madison County		
Chase	1	Madison County	35743	
Chastang	1	Mobile County	36560	
Chatom	1	Washington County	36518	
Chattasofkee	1	Tallapoosa County		
Chavies	1	DeKalb County		
Chehaw	1	Macon County		
Chelsea	1	Madison County		
Chelsea	1	Shelby County	35043	
Chepultepec	1	Blount County		
Cherokee	1	Colbert County	35616	
Cherokee Bluffs	1	Tallapoosa County	36078	
Cherokee Forest	1	Jefferson County	35223	
Cherokees of Southeast Alabama	7	Autauga County		
Cherokees of Southeast Alabama	7	Chambers County		
Cherokees of Southeast Alabama	7	Dale County		
Cherokees of Southeast Alabama	7	DeKalb County		
Cherokees of Southeast Alabama	7	Elmore County		
Cherokees of Southeast Alabama	7	Houston County		
Cherokees of Southeast Alabama	7	Lee County		
Cherokee Tribe of Northeast Alabama	1	DeKalb County		
Cherokee Village	1	Crenshaw County		
Cherry Grove	1	Limestone County	35611	
Cherrytree	1	Madison County		
Chesson	1	Macon County	36029	
Chestang	1	Washington County		
Chester	1	Montgomery County		
Chesterfield	1	Cherokee County	30731	
Chestnut	1	Monroe County	36425	
Chestnut Grove	1	Coffee County	36346	
Chetopa	1	Jefferson County		
Chewacla	1	Lee County		
Chickasaw	1	Mobile County	36611	
Chickasaw Terrace	1	Mobile County	36610	
Chigger Hill	1	DeKalb County	35974	
Childersburg	2	Shelby County	35044	
Childersburg	2	Talladega County	35044	
Chilton	1	Clarke County	36451	
China	1	Conecuh County	36401	
China Grove	1	Pike County	36081	
Chinn	1	Jefferson County		
Chinnabee	1	Talladega County		
Chinneby	1	Talladega County	36268	
Chisholm	1	Montgomery County	36110	
Chism	1	Dale County		
Choccolocco	1	Calhoun County	36254	
Choctaw	1	Choctaw County		
Choctaw Bluff	1	Clarke County	36545	
Choctaw City	1	Choctaw County	36912	
Choctow Corner	1	Clarke County	36784	
Chosea Springs	1	Calhoun County	36203	
Christiana	1	Randolph County	36258	
Chrysler	1	Monroe County	36550	
Chulafinnee	1	Cleburne County	36264	
Chulavista	1	St. Clair County		
Chunchula	1	Mobile County	36521	
Chunnenuggee	1	Bullock County		
Church Hill	1	Tallapoosa County	36879	
Circlewood	1	Tuscaloosa County	35404	
Citico	1	Etowah County		
Citronelle	1	Mobile County	36522	
Clackville	1	Chambers County		
Claiborne	1	Monroe County	36470	
Clairmont Springs	1	Clay County	35160	
Clanton	1	Chilton County	35045	
Clarence	1	Blount County	35952	
Clark Crossroads	1	Houston County		
Clarkdale	1	Madison County		
Clarke	1	Walker County		
Clarksville	1	Clarke County	36524	
Claud	1	Elmore County	36024	
Clay	1	Jefferson County	35048	
Clay City	1	Baldwin County	36532	
Clayhatchee	1	Dale County	36322	
Clayhill	1	Marengo County	36784	
Claysville	1	Marshall County	35976	
Clayton	1	Barbour County	36016	
Clear Springs	1	Blount County	35121	
Clearview	1	Covington County	36028	
Clearview	1	Crenshaw County	36041	
Cleburne	1	Cleburne County		
Clemons Crossroad	1	Morgan County		
Cleveland	1	Blount County	35049	
Cleveland	1	Fayette County	35542	
Cleveland Crossroads	1	Clay County	35072	
Cleveland Mills	1	Perry County		
Cliff Haven	1	Colbert County	35661	
Clift Acres	1	Madison County		
Clifty	1	Cullman County		
Clinton	1	Greene County	35448	
Clintonville	1	Coffee County	36351	
Clio	1	Barbour County	36017	
Clisby Park	1	Montgomery County		
Clopton	1	Dale County	36317	
Cloverdale	1	Jefferson County		
Cloverdale	1	Lauderdale County	35617	
Cloverdale	1	Montgomery County		
Cloverdale	1	Shelby County		
Cloverdale	1	Tuscaloosa County	35404	
Cloverdale Heights	1	Lauderdale County	35633	
Clover Hill	1	Lowndes County		
Cloverland	1	Montgomery County	36105	
Clowers Crossroads	1	Coffee County		
Clubview Heights	1	Etowah County	35901	
Cluttsville	1	Madison County	35749	
Coal Bluff	1	Wilcox County	36789	
Coalburg	1	Jefferson County	35068	
Coal City	1	St. Clair County	35182	
Coaldale	1	Jefferson County		
Coal Fire	1	Pickens County	35481	
Coaling	1	Tuscaloosa County	35449	
Coalmont	1	Shelby County	35114	
Coal Valley	1	Walker County	35579	
Coates	1	Henry County		
Coatopa	1	Sumter County	35470	
Cobb City	1	Etowah County	35905	
Cobbs Ford	1	Elmore County	36025	
Cobb Town	1	Calhoun County	36203	
Cochrane	1	Pickens County	35442	
Coden	1	Mobile County	36523	
Cody	1	Lamar County	35555	
Coffee Springs	1	Geneva County	36318	
Coffeeville	1	Clarke County	36524	
Cohassett	1	Conecuh County	36474	
Coker	1	Tuscaloosa County	35452	
Colbert	1	Russell County		
Colbert Heights	1	Colbert County	35674	
Cold Springs	1	Cullman County	35033	
Cold Springs	1	Elmore County	36022	
Cold Springs	1	Morgan County	35622	
Coldwater	1	Calhoun County	36260	
Coldwater	1	Cleburne County	36262	
Coleanor	1	Bibb County		
Coleman	1	Perry County		
Cole Spring	1	Morgan County		
Collbran	1	DeKalb County	35971	
Collins	1	Jefferson County		
Collins Chapel	1	Chilton County	35045	
Collinsville	2	Cherokee County	35961	
Collinsville	2	DeKalb County	35961	
Collirene	1	Lowndes County	36785	
Coloma	1	Cherokee County	35960	
Colonial Heights	1	Colbert County	35674	
Colony	1	Cullman County	35077	
Colony	1	Tuscaloosa County	35476	
Colta	1	Walker County		
Columbia	1	Houston County	36319	
Columbiana	1	Shelby County	35051	
Columbus	1	Jefferson County		
Columbus City	1	Marshall County	35976	
Colwell	1	Calhoun County	35905	
Comer	1	Barbour County	36053	
Commerce	1	Conecuh County		
Concord	1	Blount County	35049	
Concord	1	Jefferson County	35023	
Congo	1	Cherokee County	35959	
Conifer	1	Elmore County	36078	
Consul	1	Marengo County	36743	
Contwell	1	Choctaw County		
Cooks	1	Montgomery County		
Cooks Crossroads	1	Conecuh County		
Cooks Springs	1	St. Clair County	35052	
Cooley Crossroads	1	Clay County		
Cool Springs	1	St. Clair County	35953	
Coon Creek	1	Walker County	35063	
Cooper	1	Chilton County	36091	
Coopers Mill	1	Jackson County		
Coosa Court	1	Talladega County	35044	
Coosada	1	Elmore County	36020	
Coosa Pines	1	Talladega County	35044	
Coosa River	1	Elmore County	36022	
Copeland	1	Washington County	36558	
Copeland Bridge	1	DeKalb County	35961	
Copeland School	1	Limestone County		
Copper Springs	1	St. Clair County	35120	
Coppinville	1	Coffee County	36330	
Corbinville	1	Marshall County		
Corcoran	1	Pike County	36081	
Cordova	1	Walker County	35550	
Corduroy	1	Monroe County		
Corinth	1	Bullock County	36081	
Corinth	1	Cullman County	35179	
Corinth	1	Randolph County	36278	
Corner	1	Jefferson County	35180	
Cornerstone	1	Bullock County		
Cornhouse	1	Randolph County	36274	
Cornwall Furnace	1	Cherokee County	35959	
Corona	1	Walker County	35546	
Cortelyou	1	Washington County	36585	
Cotaco	1	Morgan County	35670	
Cottage Grove	1	Coosa County	35088	
Cottage Hill	1	Jefferson County	35127	
Cottage Hill	1	Mobile County	36691	
Cotton	1	Elmore County		
Cottondale	1	Tuscaloosa County	35453	
Cotton Hill	1	Barbour County		
Cottonton	1	Russell County	36851	
Cottontown	1	Colbert County	35646	
Cotton Valley	1	Macon County	36083	
Cottonville	1	Marshall County	35247	
Cottonwood	1	Houston County	36320	
Council Bluff	1	DeKalb County		
Country Club Acres	1	Limestone County	35611	
Country Club Estates	1	Madison County		
Country Club Estates	1	Mobile County		
Country Club Highlands	1	Jefferson County	35216	
Country Club Village	1	Mobile County		
Country Estates	1	Jefferson County		
County Line	2	Blount County	35172	
County Line	2	Jefferson County	35172	
County Line	1	Covington County	36453	
County Line	1	Pike County	36034	
Courtland	1	Lawrence County	35618	
Covin	1	Fayette County	35555	
Cowarts	1	Houston County	36321	
Cowpens	1	Tallapoosa County		
Cox	1	Bibb County		
Cox Beach	1	Mobile County		
Coxey	1	Limestone County	35611	
Coxheath	1	Marengo County		
Coy	1	Wilcox County	36435	
Cragford	1	Clay County	36255	
Craig Air Force Base	1	Dallas County	36701	
Crane Hill	1	Cullman County	35053	
Crawford	1	Russell County	36867	
Crawford Fork	1	Greene County		
Creek Ford	1	Marshall County		
Creek Stand	1	Macon County	36089	
Creel	1	Walker County		
Creel Town	1	Walker County	35063	
Creola	1	Mobile County	36525	
Crescent Heights	1	Jefferson County	35023	
Crestline	1	Jefferson County	35223	
Crestline Gardens	1	Jefferson County		
Crestline Heights	1	Jefferson County	35213	
Crestline Park	1	Jefferson County		
Crestview	1	Mobile County		
Crestview Gardens	1	St. Clair County	35125	
Crestview Hills	1	Jefferson County		
Crestwood	1	Madison County		
Creswell	1	Shelby County	35078	
Crews	1	Lamar County	35586	
Crewsville	1	Coosa County		
Crichton	1	Mobile County	36607	
Crockard Junction	1	Jefferson County		
Crockett Junction	1	Jefferson County		
Cromwell	1	Choctaw County	36906	
Crooked Oak	1	Colbert County	35674	
Cropwell	1	St. Clair County	35054	
Crosby	1	Houston County	36343	
Cross Key	1	Limestone County	35620	
Cross Keys	1	Macon County		
Crossroad	1	Jackson County		
Crossroads	1	Baldwin County	36507	
Cross Roads	1	Clarke County	36570	
Crossroads	1	Marshall County	35976	
Crosston	1	Jefferson County	35126	
Crossville	1	DeKalb County	35962	
Crossville	1	Lamar County	35592	
Crowtown	1	Morgan County		
Crudup	1	Etowah County	35954	
Crumley Chapel	1	Jefferson County	35214	
Crumptonia	1	Dallas County		
Cuba	1	Sumter County	36907	
Culebra	1	Chambers County		
Cullman	1	Cullman County	35055	
Cullomburg	1	Choctaw County	36920	
Culpeper	1	Wilcox County		
Cumbee Mill	1	Chambers County		
Cumberland Junction	1	Jackson County		
Cunningham	1	Clarke County	36727	
Cunningham	1	Pickens County	35442	
Curry	1	Pike County		
Curry	1	Talladega County	36268	
Curry	1	Walker County	35501	
Currys	1	Montgomery County		
Currytown	1	Dale County	36350	
Curtis	1	Coffee County	36323	
Curtis Crossroads	1	Winston County		
Curtiston	1	Etowah County	35954	
Cusseta	1	Chambers County	36852	
Cymbling Branch	1	Jefferson County		
Cypress	1	Hale County	35474	
Cypress Heights	1	Lauderdale County	35633	
Cyril	1	Choctaw County	36912	
