= Alabama State Route 102 =

State highway in Alabama, United States

State Route 102

Route information
- Maintained by ALDOT
- Length: 24.281 mi (39.076 km)
- Existed: 1962–present

Major junctions
- West end: US 43 / SR 171 north of Fayette
- SR 13 west of Townley
- East end: SR 124 in Townley

Location
- Country: United States
- State: Alabama
- Counties: Fayette, Walker

Highway system
- Alabama State Highway System; Interstate; US; State
← SR 101	→ SR 103

State Route 102 (SR 102) is a 24.281-mile-long (39.076 km) east–west state highway in the western part of the U.S. state of Alabama. The western terminus of the highway is at an intersection with U.S. Route 43 (US 43) approximately six miles (9.7 km) north of Fayette. The eastern terminus of the highway is at an intersection with SR 124 in Townley in western Walker County.

== Route description ==
SR 102 serves as a connecting route between Fayette and Jasper. From its western terminus, the highway travels across Fayette and Walker counties. It does not travel through any incorporated cities. It travels eastward along a road with numerous curves. The route reaches its eastern terminus in the unincorporated town of Townley, where it intersects SR 124, which heads to Jasper.

== History ==
SR 102 was designated in 1962. It replaced Fayette County Route 47 (CR 47) and Walker CR 47.

== Future ==
SR 102 will have an interchange with Interstate 22 (I-22) at exit 53.

== Major intersections ==
County	Location	mi	km	Destinations	Notes
Fayette	Fayette	0.000	0.000	US 43 / SR 171 – Fayette, Winfield	Western terminus
Fayette	West Fayette	0.375	0.604	SR 129 – Glen Allen	
Fayette	Mater, Fayette County	9.225	14.846	SR 13 – Tuscaloosa, Eldridge	
Walker	Townley	24.281	39.076	SR 124 – Carbon Hill, Jasper	Current eastern terminus of western section; continues as Wire Road
1.000 mi = 1.609 km; 1.000 km = 0.621 mi
