= Parrish, Alabama =

- Town
- Flag

- Location of Parrish in Walker County, Alabama.
- Coordinates: 33°43′57″N 87°16′45″W
- Country: United States
- State: Alabama
- County: Walker

Government
  - Type: Mayor - Council

Area
  - Total: 2.09 sq mi (5.42 km^{2})
  - Land: 2.09 sq mi (5.42 km^{2})
  - Water: 0 sq mi (0.00 km^{2})
- Elevation: 397 ft (121 m)

Population (2020)
  - Total: 982
  - Density: 469.2/sq mi (181.14/km^{2})
- Time zone: UTC-6 (Central (CST))
  - Summer (DST): UTC-5 (CDT)
- ZIP code: 35580
- Area codes: 205, 659
- FIPS code: 01-58272
- GNIS feature ID: 2407076
- Website: townofparrish.com

Parrish is a town in Walker County, Alabama, United States. It was incorporated in October 1922. As of the 2020 census, Parrish had a population of 982.

== Geography ==
According to the U.S. Census Bureau, the town has a total area of 2.1 square miles (5.4 km^{2}), all land.

== Demographics ==
Historical population
Census	Pop.	Note	%±
1930	987		—
1940	870		−11.9%
1950	757		−13.0%
1960	1,608		112.4%
1970	1,742		8.3%
1980	1,583		−9.1%
1990	1,433		−9.5%
2000	1,268		−11.5%
2010	982		−22.6%
2020	982		0.0%
U.S. Decennial Census; 2013 Estimate

As of the census of 2000, there were 1,268 people, 506 households, and 358 families residing in the town. The population density was 605.2 inhabitants per square mile (233.7/km^{2}). There were 587 housing units at an average density of 280.2 per square mile (108.2/km^{2}). The racial makeup of Parrish is 72.63% White, 25.32% Black or African American, 0.16% Native American, 0.16% Asian, 0.63% from other races, and 1.10% from two or more races. 0.95% of the population were Hispanic or Latino of any race.

There were 506 households, out of which 28.3% had children under the age of 18 living with them, 48.6% were married couples living together, 16.8% had a female householder with no husband present, and 29.1% were non-families. 25.1% of all households were made up of individuals, and 10.9% had someone living alone who was 65 years of age or older. The average household size was 2.51 and the average family size was 3.01.

In the town, the population was spread out, with 23.7% under the age of 18, 8.5% from 18 to 24, 28.5% from 25 to 44, 24.1% from 45 to 64, and 15.1% who were 65 years of age or older. The median age was 39 years. For every 100 females, there were 91.8 males. For every 100 females age 18 and over, there were 86.2 males.

The median income for a household in the town was $21,711, and the median income for a family was $26,193. Males had a median income of $25,341 versus $16,900 for females. The per capita income for the town was $11,270. About 21.3% of families and 24.2% of the population were below the poverty line, including 28.0% of those under age 18 and 26.8% of those age 65 or over.

== Education ==
Parrish Elementary and Parrish High School, members of the Walker County Board of Education, are located in Parrish. The school mascot is the Tornadoes. In 2014, the Walker County Board of Education voted to close the high school after the 2013–2014 school year due to budget constraints. Parrish High School students not graduating that year were transferred to two nearby schools; they chose between either Oakman High School in Oakman or Cordova High School in Cordova.

=== Athletics ===
In 2003, the Parrish High School football team won the Alabama High School Athletics Association Class 1A State Championship.
