= Hilliard, Alabama =

- Unincorporated community
- Location within Alabama Location within the United States
- Coordinates: 33°51′14″N 87°10′58″W
- Country: United States
- State: Alabama
- County: Walker
- Elevation: 351 ft (107 m)
- Time zone: UTC-6 (Central (CST))
  - Summer (DST): UTC-5 (CDT)
- Area codes: 205, 659
- GNIS feature ID: 156475

Hilliard, also known as Kings, is an unincorporated community in Walker County, Alabama, United States. Hilliard is located along Alabama State Route 124, 6 miles (9.7 km) west of Jasper.

== History ==
Hilliard was the first county seat of Walker County before the county seat was moved to Jasper.
