= Loel Passe =

American sports broadcaster (1917–1997)

- Born: Loel Elijah Passe; May 29, 1917; Aldridge, Alabama, U.S.
- Died: July 15, 1997 (aged 80); Houston, Texas, U.S.
- Sports commentary career
- Team: Houston Colt .45s/Astros (1962–76)
- Genre: Play-by-play
- Sport: Major League Baseball

Loel Elijah Passe (/ˈloʊəl ˈpæs/; May 29, 1917 – July 15, 1997) was an American sports broadcaster.

After working for a radio station in Alabama, Passe was a baseball play-by-play announcer for the minor league Houston Buffaloes beginning in 1950. When Houston was awarded a major league franchise, the Houston Colt .45s (later renamed the Houston Astros), Passe was one of the team's broadcasters from 1962 to 1976.

== Biography ==
Passe had worked in radio in Birmingham since at least 1944. Roy Hofheinz owned several radio stations in the American South, including the Birmingham station that employed Passe. In 1950, Hofheinz hired Passe to broadcast for the Houston Buffaloes, a minor league baseball team.

When Houston received the expansion Colt .45s in 1962, Passe was one of the major league team's original broadcasters, joined by Gene Elston and Al Helfer. While Helfer only spent one season in Houston, Passe was partnered with Gene Elston from 1962 to 1976. In a 1971 Sports Illustrated article, Passe said that he preferred the rare televised game to his radio work, but he affirmed his love for broadcasting, saying, "When you love baseball the way I do and broadcast major league games from the great cities of the country—man, that's living."

While Elston was calm and neutral in the broadcast booth, Passe impartially cheered on the Astros, even when the team was not having a good season. After a nice Astros play, Passe was known to use colorful phrases such as "Now you're chunkin', in there, pardner!" and "Hot ziggety dog and good ole' sassafras tea!" During away games, the Astros Spanish-language broadcasts were not live, as broadcaster René Cárdenas simply listened to the English broadcasts and translated them. Cárdenas said that Passe spoke such non-standard English that his words often could not be intelligibly translated into Spanish.

Passe did not miss a game during his tenure with the Astros. He remained on the Astros broadcasting team until 1976. After leaving baseball, Passe was vice president of Osborne International, a freight company. He died of cancer at his Houston home on July 15, 1997. He was buried at Forest Park Westheimer in Houston. Passe was posthumously inducted into the Texas Radio Hall of Fame.
