= Parrish High School =

Coordinates: 33°43′55.1″N 87°15′54.0″W

Location
- 35 Tornado Alley; Parrish, Alabama 35580; United States

Information
- School type: Public
- Established: 1920
- Status: Closed
- Closed: 2014
- School board: Walker County Board of Education
- Principal: Jodi Claborn
- Grades: 7-12
- Enrollment: Coeducational
- Colors: Purple and white
- Mascot: Tornadoes
- Rival: Cordova High School, Oakman High School
- Feeder schools: Parrish Elementary School

Parrish High School was a secondary education public school located in Parrish, Alabama and was a part of the Walker County School System.

== History ==
The original Parrish High School building opened in 1920 on the present site of Parrish Elementary School. The school was moved in 1935 to a site on the hill to the west of the elementary school. This site was consumed by fire in 1979 and subsequently moved to its current location just off Alabama 269. An on-campus football stadium was built some years later, named Harland-Nelson Stadium.

In 2014, the Walker County Board of Education voted to close the high school after the 2013–2014 school year along with Sipsey Jr. High School and T.S. Boyd Elementary School due to budget constraints. Parris High School students not graduating that year were transferred to two nearby schools; they chose between either Oakman High School in Oakman or Cordova High School in Cordova.

== Athletics ==
The Parrish High School football team played its football games at Harland-Nelson Stadium which is named after a former head coach George Harland and the Nelson Brothers Inc. a proud company supporter. They won the AHSAA Class 1A State Championship in 2003. The Parrish High School Basketball team made the 2013 State Championship game, While the Parrish High School Softball team won the 2013 State Championship
