= McCollum, Alabama =

- Unincorporated community
- Location within Alabama Location within the United States
- Coordinates: 33°49′04″N 87°19′31″W
- Country: United States
- State: Alabama
- County: Walker
- Elevation: 436 ft (133 m)
- Time zone: UTC-6 (Central (CST))
  - Summer (DST): UTC-5 (CDT)
- Area codes: 205, 659
- GNIS feature ID: 122485

McCollum is an unincorporated community in Walker County, Alabama, United States. McCollum is located along Alabama State Route 69, 3 miles (4.8 km) west of Jasper.

== History ==
McCollum is named for the McCollum family, who were early settlers of the area. A post office operated under the name McCollum from 1903 to 1909. It is located where State Route 69 and State Route 124 split.
