= Mount Hope, Alabama =

Mount Hope is the name of places in the U.S. state of Alabama:

- Mount Hope, Lawrence County, Alabama
- Mount Hope, Walker County, Alabama
