= Lupton, Alabama =

- Unincorporated community
- Location within Alabama Location within the United States
- Coordinates: 33°56′10″N 87°23′50″W
- Country: United States
- State: Alabama
- County: Walker
- Elevation: 548 ft (167 m)
- Time zone: UTC-6 (Central (CST))
  - Summer (DST): UTC-5 (CDT)
- Area codes: 205, 659
- GNIS feature ID: 162324

Lupton is an unincorporated community in Walker County, Alabama, United States. Lupton is located along Alabama State Route 5, 11 miles (18 km) northwest of Jasper.

== History ==
Lupton is home to Lupton School, an elementary/middle school that is part of the Walker County Board of Education.
