= Dogtown, Walker County, Alabama =

Dogtown, Alabama
- Unincorporated community
- Location within Alabama Location within the United States
- Coordinates: 33°56′53″N 87°34′00″W
- Country: United States
- State: Alabama
- County: Walker
- Elevation: 597 ft (182 m)
- Time zone: UTC-6 (Central (CST))
  - Summer (DST): UTC-5 (CDT)
- Area codes: 205, 659
- GNIS feature ID: 117345

Dogtown is an unincorporated community in Walker County, Alabama, United States.

== History ==
United States federal judge Frank Minis Johnson's father, Frank M. Johnson Sr., formerly taught at a school in Dogtown.

The area is home to several abandoned coal mines.
