= Boshell's Mill =

- U.S. National Register of Historic Places
- U.S. Historic district
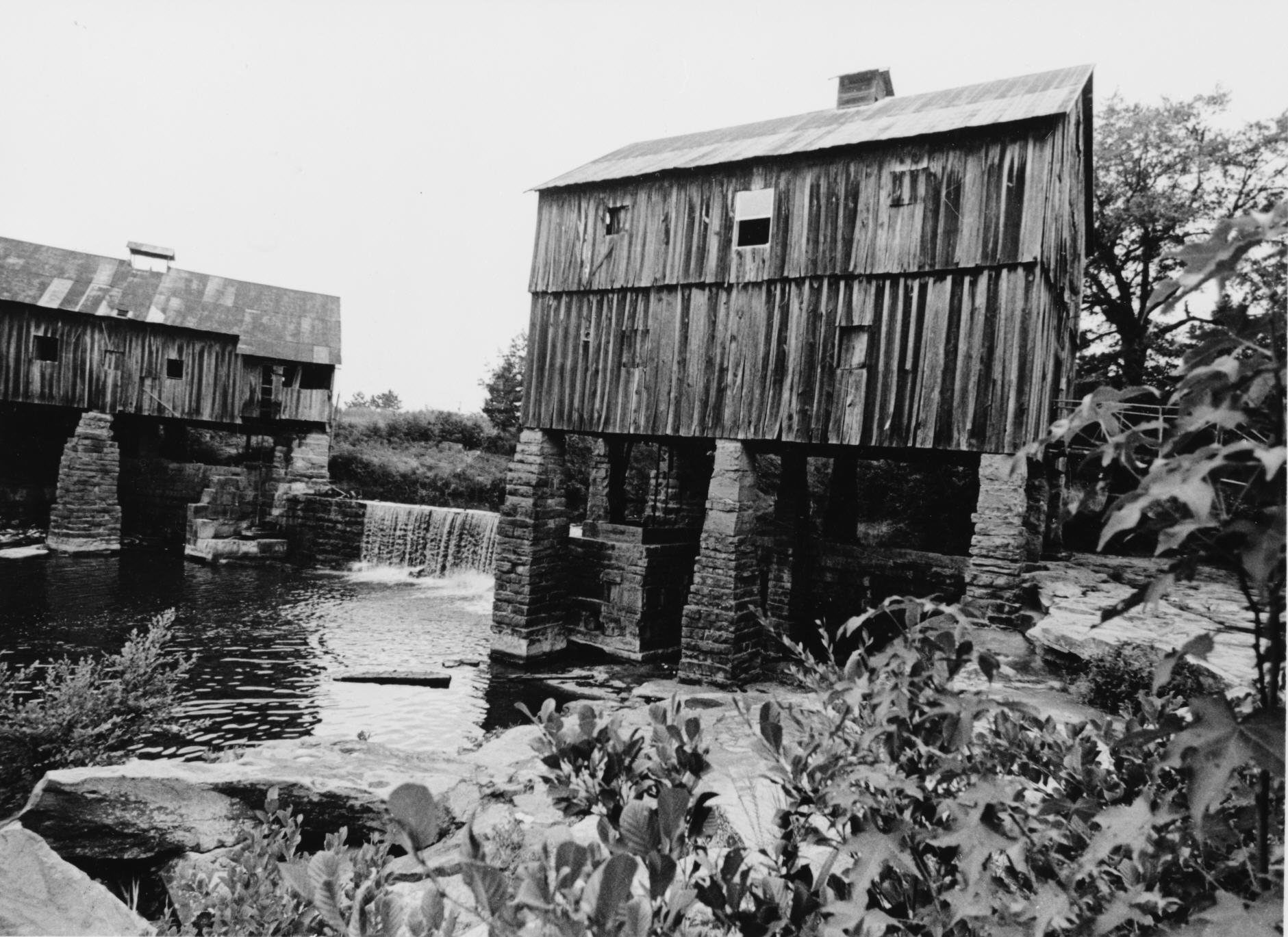
- Boshell's Mill in 1973, with the sawmill on the left side of the dam and the gristmill on the right.

- Location within Alabama Location within the United States
- Nearest city: Townley, Alabama
- Coordinates: 33°51′17″N 87°26′51″W
- Area: 4 acres (1.6 ha)
- Built: 1885–1903
- Built by: W. R. Boshell
- NRHP reference No.: 75000329
- Added to NRHP: May 30, 1975

Boshell's Mill is the historic site of a gristmill and sawmill on Lost Creek near Townley in rural Walker County, Alabama. The 4-acre (1.6 ha) site was listed on the National Register of Historic Places in 1975. It was recorded by the Historic American Engineering Record as part of the Birmingham District in 1992.

== History ==
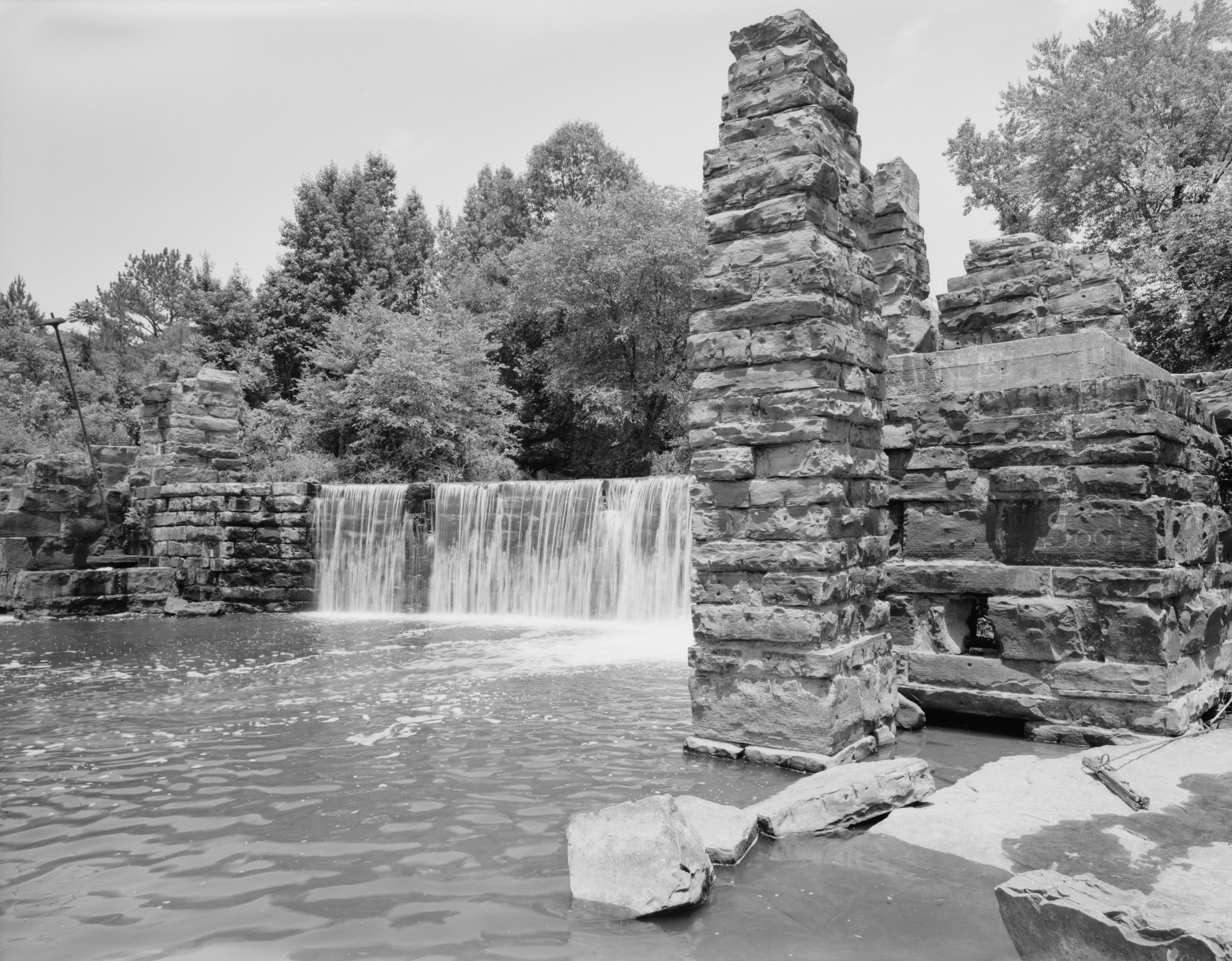
The mill site in 1992.

Boshell's Mill, one of several mills run by the Boshell family in Walker County, was started by William R. Boshell in 1885. It was initially a steam engine-powered sawmill only, with the creek used to transport logs to the mill. Boshell expanded the mill in 1901 with the addition of a dam built using locally quarried stone. It was completed in 1902. A gristmill was built on the opposite bank of the creek in 1903. Water turbines at each end of the dam supplied power to each mill.

The Boshell family operated the mills until 1963. It was listed on the National Register on May 30, 1975. A fire destroyed the sawmill building in 1976. Another fire destroyed the gristmill in 1986. The stone foundation piers and dam currently remain intact.
