= Slicklizzard, Alabama =

- Unincorporated community
- Location within Alabama Location within the United States
- Coordinates: 33°57′52″N 87°30′07″W
- Country: United States
- State: Alabama
- County: Walker
- Elevation: 331 ft (101 m)
- Time zone: UTC-6 (Central (CST))
  - Summer (DST): UTC-5 (CDT)
- Area codes: 205, 659

Slicklizzard is an unincorporated community in Walker County, Alabama, United States.

According to tradition, Slicklizard was so named because local miners had to crawl through muddy passages and in the process became "slick as a lizard".
