= Chavis Williams =

American football player and coach (born 1989)

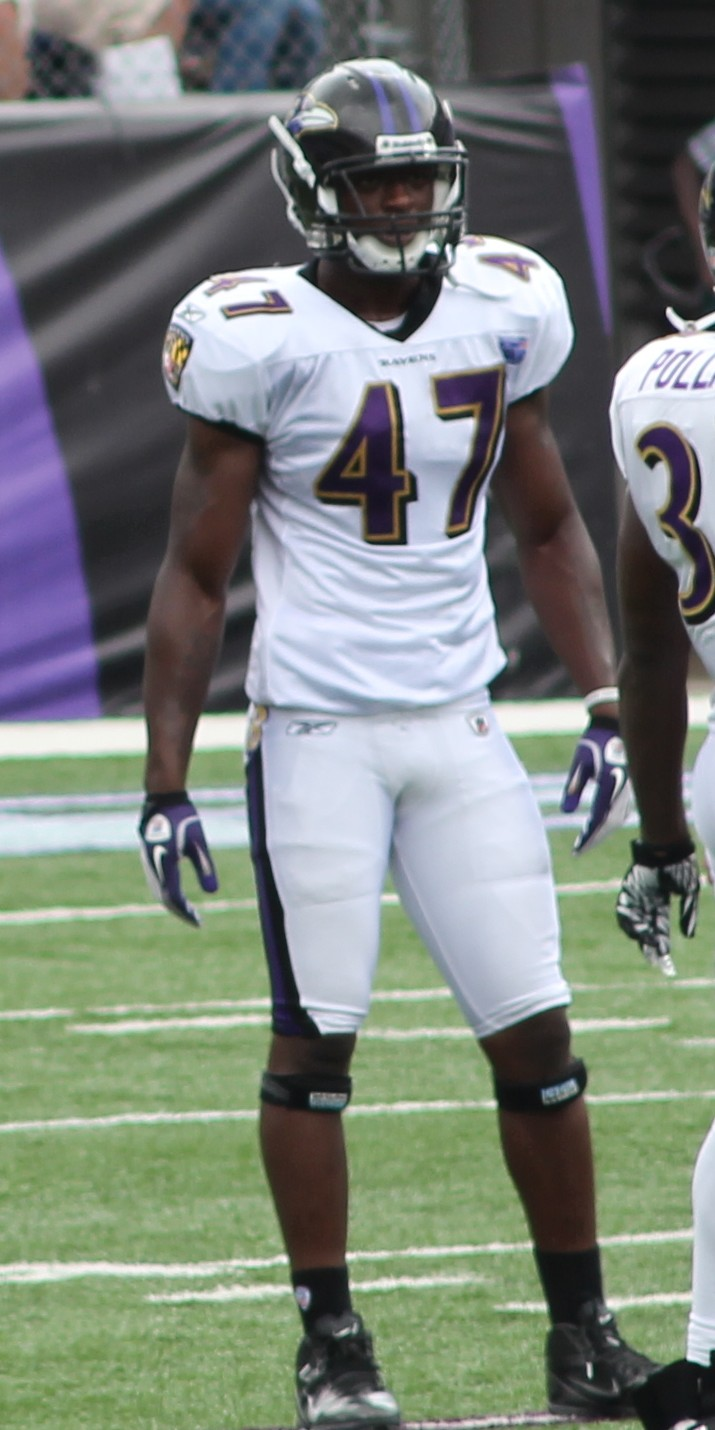
- Williams at M&T Bank Stadium in August 2011

No. 47
- Position: Linebacker

Personal information
- Born: July 10, 1989 (age 37); Dora, Alabama, U.S.
- Listed height: 6 ft 3 in (1.91 m)
- Listed weight: 240 lb (109 kg)

Career information
- High school: Dora
- College: Alabama
- NFL draft: 2011: undrafted

Career history
- Baltimore Ravens (2011)

Awards and highlights
- BCS national champion (2010)

Career NFL statistics
- Total tackles: 2
- Stats at Pro Football Reference

Chavis Williams (born July 10, 1989) is an American former professional football player who was a linebacker for the Baltimore Ravens of the National Football League (NFL). He played college football for the Alabama Crimson Tide. He was the head coach at Carbon Hill High School from 2019-2020 and head coach at Dora High School from 2021-2025 in Alabama.

== Early life ==
Williams attended Dora High School, where he was ranked nationally by Scout.com as the No. 39 DE and No. 22 in Alabama entering college. Rated as a top 50 defensive linemen by Rivals.com. Selected first team All-State Class 4A by the Alabama Sports Writers Association. Finished second on his team with 123 tackles and added 11 sacks as a senior. Also played TE, posting 393 receiving yards and 6 touchdowns. Accumulated 81 tackles (averaging 9 per game) and 8 sacks as a junior.

== College career ==
Williams appeared in 33 career games and produced 17 tackles in four years (2007–10) at Alabama. Earned a starting role in eight contests during his senior season, recording 12 tackles (5 solo) in 13 games. Also recorded Alabama's only blocked kick in 2010 and posted a career-high 3 stops against Penn State. Played in seven games with 2 tackles as a junior for the Crimson Tide in 2009, contributing mostly as a third-down pass rusher and on special teams. Served as a reserve LB as a sophomore in 2008, appearing in five contests mainly with special teams. Recorded 1 sack (-9 yards) against Clemson at the Georgia Dome. Appeared in eight games as a freshman in 2007 at both LB and on special teams, recording 2 tackles (1 solo).

== Professional career ==
Williams was signed by the Baltimore Ravens as an undrafted free agent. He was later promoted from the practice squad to the active roster. On August 31, 2012, he was released.

== Coaching career ==
On May 21, 2019, Williams was named head football coach at Carbon Hill High School in central Alabama where he led the team to the playoffs for the first time since 1999. He was named head football coach of his alma mater, Dora High School, on December 10, 2020, a position he held through 2025.
