= Corona, Alabama =

- Unincorporated community
- Location within Alabama Location within the United States
- Coordinates: 33°42′30″N 87°28′10″W
- Country: United States
- State: Alabama
- County: Walker
- Elevation: 325 ft (99 m)
- Time zone: UTC-6 (Central (CST))
  - Summer (DST): UTC-5 (CDT)
- Area codes: 205, 659
- GNIS feature ID: 116660

Corona is an unincorporated community in Walker County, Alabama, United States. Corona is located on Alabama State Route 18, 4.6 miles (7.4 km) west of Oakman.

== History ==
Corona was founded in the 1880s after the Corona Coal Company opened mines here. The first coal shipped from Walker County by rail came from the Corona mines. A post office operated under the name Corona from 1884 to 1957.
