= Spring Hill, Walker County, Alabama =

Spring Hill, Alabama
- Unincorporated community
- Location within Alabama Location within the United States
- Coordinates: 33°58′39″N 87°33′29″W
- Country: United States
- State: Alabama
- County: Walker
- Elevation: 659 ft (201 m)
- Time zone: UTC-6 (Central (CST))
  - Summer (DST): UTC-5 (CDT)
- Area code: 334
- GNIS feature ID: 157092

Spring Hill is an unincorporated community in Walker County, Alabama, United States, located 6.2 miles (10.0 km) north-northwest of Carbon Hill.
