= Union Chapel, Alabama =

- Unincorporated community
- Location within Alabama Location within the United States
- Coordinates: 33°49′00″N 87°10′40″W
- Country: United States
- State: Alabama
- County: Walker
- Elevation: 436 ft (133 m)
- Time zone: UTC-6 (Central (CST))
  - Summer (DST): UTC-5 (CDT)
- Area codes: 205, 659
- GNIS feature ID: 128274

Union Chapel is an unincorporated community located in Walker County, Alabama, United States.
