= Kansas, Alabama =

- Town
- Location of Kansas in Walker County, Alabama.
- Coordinates: 33°54′10″N 87°33′25″W
- Country: United States
- State: Alabama
- County: Walker

Area
  - Total: 1.02 sq mi (2.64 km^{2})
  - Land: 1.02 sq mi (2.63 km^{2})
  - Water: 0.0039 sq mi (0.01 km^{2})
- Elevation: 482 ft (147 m)

Population (2020)
  - Total: 180
  - Density: 177.1/sq mi (68.36/km^{2})
- Time zone: UTC-6 (Central (CST))
  - Summer (DST): UTC-5 (CDT)
- ZIP code: 35573
- Area codes: 205, 659
- FIPS code: 01-39280
- GNIS feature ID: 2405930

Kansas is a town in Walker County, Alabama, United States. It incorporated in 1956. As of the 2020 census, Kansas had a population of 180.

== History ==
A post office called Kansas has been in operation since 1855. The town was named after the Kansas Territory.

== Geography ==
According to the U.S. Census Bureau, the town has a total area of 1.0 square mile (2.6 km^{2}), all land.

== Demographics ==
Historical population
Census	Pop.	Note	%±
1960	211		—
1970	227		7.6%
1980	267		17.6%
1990	230		−13.9%
2000	260		13.0%
2010	226		−13.1%
2020	180		−20.4%
U.S. Decennial Census; 2013 Estimate

As of the census of 2000, there were 260 people, 117 households, and 80 families residing in the town. The population density was 260.0 inhabitants per square mile (100.4/km^{2}). There were 128 housing units at an average density of 128.0 per square mile (49.4/km^{2}). The racial makeup of the town was 99.23% White, 0.38% Asian, and 0.38% from two or more races.

There were 117 households, out of which 25.6% had children under the age of 18 living with them, 53.0% were married couples living together, 12.0% had a female householder with no husband present, and 31.6% were non-families. 26.5% of all households were made up of individuals, and 12.8% had someone living alone who was 65 years of age or older. The average household size was 2.22 and the average family size was 2.69.

In the town, the population was spread out, with 19.2% under the age of 18, 8.8% from 18 to 24, 25.0% from 25 to 44, 28.8% from 45 to 64, and 18.1% who were 65 years of age or older. The median age was 42 years. For every 100 females, there were 85.7 males. For every 100 females age 18 and over, there were 81.0 males.

The median income for a household in the town was $23,021, and the median income for a family was $24,167. Males had a median income of $25,000 versus $21,750 for females. The per capita income for the town was $13,416. About 16.3% of families and 16.4% of the population were below the poverty line, including 21.2% of those under the age of eighteen and 21.6% of those 65 or over.
