= Burnwell, Alabama =

- Unincorporated community
- Location within Alabama Location within the United States
- Coordinates: 33°42′28″N 87°05′15″W
- Country: United States
- State: Alabama
- County: Walker
- Elevation: 364 ft (111 m)
- Time zone: UTC-6 (Central (CST))
  - Summer (DST): UTC-5 (CDT)
- ZIP code: 35038
- Area codes: 205, 659
- GNIS feature ID: 115272

Burnwell is an unincorporated community in Walker County, Alabama, United States, located on the southern border of Dora. Burnwell had a post office from May 21, 1910, to December 30, 2010; it still has its own ZIP code, 35038.
