= Sybil Gibson =

American female painter (1908–1995)

- Born: Sybil Aaron; February 18, 1908; Dora, Alabama, U.S.
- Died: January 2, 1995 (aged 86); Dunedin, Florida, U.S.
- Known for: Painting
- Movement: Outsider art, folk art, naive, self-taught
- Spouse(s): Hugh Gibson (m. 1929–1935; divorce), David DeYarmon (m. c. 1950–1958; death)

Sybil Gibson (née Sybil Aaron; February 18, 1908 – January 2, 1995) was a self-taught American painter.

== Early life and education ==
Gibson was born Sybil Aaron in Dora, Alabama, to parents Lenora Reid Aaron and Monroe Aaron. Her father was a wealthy coal mine owner and farmer. He owned and operated the Sulphur Springs Coal Company. She was one of eight children.

She was educated at Jacksonville State Teachers College, earning a B.S. in Elementary Education before going on to become a teacher.

== Career ==
For much of her adult life she had no interest in painting, having had her ambitions crushed when a college art teacher told her she had no talent. However, on Thanksgiving Day 1963, aged 55, Gibson took to creating her own wrapping paper designs using tempera paint and brown paper grocery bags. This led to a fascination with creating art which lasted until her death.

Howell Raines wrote in June 1971 that "the paintings are not over-powering, they are truly fragile in the best sense. The colors are very delicate, and while Sybil Gibson's work is figurative, her realism is tempered with a certain dream-like quality." Gibson chose to paint limited subject matter, mainly concentrating on the human form, particularly faces, as well as flowers, birds and small animals. Her style is considered 'folk art', and she is regarded as an outsider, or naïve artist.

In May 1971, shortly before the opening of her first art exhibition at the Miami Museum of Modern Art, Gibson disappeared, leaving drawings strewn about her yard. An eccentric woman, Gibson disappeared several times. Around 300 of her paintings are believed to exist in museums and private collections, although many more have been destroyed after being strewn around outside her home when she disappeared.

Gibson's work has been exhibited in more than fifty one-woman exhibitions. Woodward Gallery in New York City represented the Estate of Sybil Gibson from 2011-2016. In 2025, Woodward Gallery formally acquired the Estate of Sybil Gibson. Her work is featured in various public museum collections including at the Montgomery Museum of Fine Arts, the Museum of American Folk Art, the Johnson Collection, Birmingham Museum of Art, and the New Orleans Museum of Art. Woodward Gallery featured Sybil Gibson in an expansive, retrospective solo exhibition, "Art from Within", from May 10 - June 21, 2014.

== Personal life and death ==
She married her high school boyfriend Hugh Gibson in 1929, with whom she raised a daughter. By 1935, she was divorced from Gibson and her parents were caring for her daughter while she went back to school. Despite her prosperous upbringing, she spent much of her adult life living in poverty.

In the late 1940s she moved to Florida due to a sinus issue.

From c. 1950 to 1958, she was married to David DeYarmon. The marriage ended when he died.

Late in life, her daughter arranged for Gibson to return to Florida, where she had an operation to restore her sight. She died on January 2, 1995, in Dunedin, Florida, aged 86.
