= Alabama State Route 124 =

State highway in Alabama, United States

State Route 124

Route information
- Maintained by ALDOT
- Length: 10.896 mi (17.535 km)

Major junctions
- West end: SR 118 east of Carbon Hill
- SR 102 in Townley
- East end: SR 69 south of Jasper

Location
- Country: United States
- State: Alabama
- Counties: Walker

Highway system
- Alabama State Highway System; Interstate; US; State
← SR 123	→ SR 125

State Route 124 (SR 124) is a 10.896-mile (17.535 km) state highway that serves the west-central areas of Walker County in the U.S. state of Alabama. SR 124 intersects SR 118 at its western terminus east of Carbon Hill and SR 69 at its eastern terminus south of Jasper.

== Route description ==
SR 124 begins at an intersection with SR 118 east of Carbon Hill. From this point, the highway travels in a southeasterly direction through Townley, where it has an intersection with SR 102. On the eastern side of Townley, SR 124 turns towards the east and continues in an easterly direction to its eastern terminus at SR 69.

== Major intersections ==
The entire route is in Walker County.

Location	mi	km	Destinations	Notes
	0.0	0.0	SR 118 – Carbon Hill, Jasper	Western terminus
Townley			SR 102 west	Eastern terminus of SR 102
	10.896	17.535	SR 69 – Oakman, Jasper	Eastern terminus
1.000 mi = 1.609 km; 1.000 km = 0.621 mi
