= E. S. Campbell =

American sailor (1921–2020)

Earnal "Spud" Spurgeon Campbell (December 28, 1921 – April 13, 2020) was an honored World War II veteran of the United States Merchant Marine. His part in the rescue of 19 Norwegian refugees was recorded in The Last Voyage of the SS Henry Bacon. This was later recognized by several governments, including Russia and Norway.

Campbell was born in Eldridge, Alabama in December 1921.

He went on to become Vice President, Engineering and Technical Services, of Radio Free Europe.

In Waves Astern, his autobiography, he recalls eight decades of adventures to exotic and sometimes isolated destinations while serving his country.

Campbell recalled the February night in a lifeboat in the Arctic filled with terrified refugees, his efforts to send SOS signals in gale-force winds, and of their miraculous rescue. Decades later, he and the survivors were reunited when he was honored by the Norwegian government. Campbell's odyssey included Cold War episodes in Eniwetok and Thule, Greenland and a 20-year career with Radio Free Europe.

He died in April 2020, at the age of 98.
