= Allenton, Alabama =

Unincorporated community in Alabama, United States

- Unincorporated community
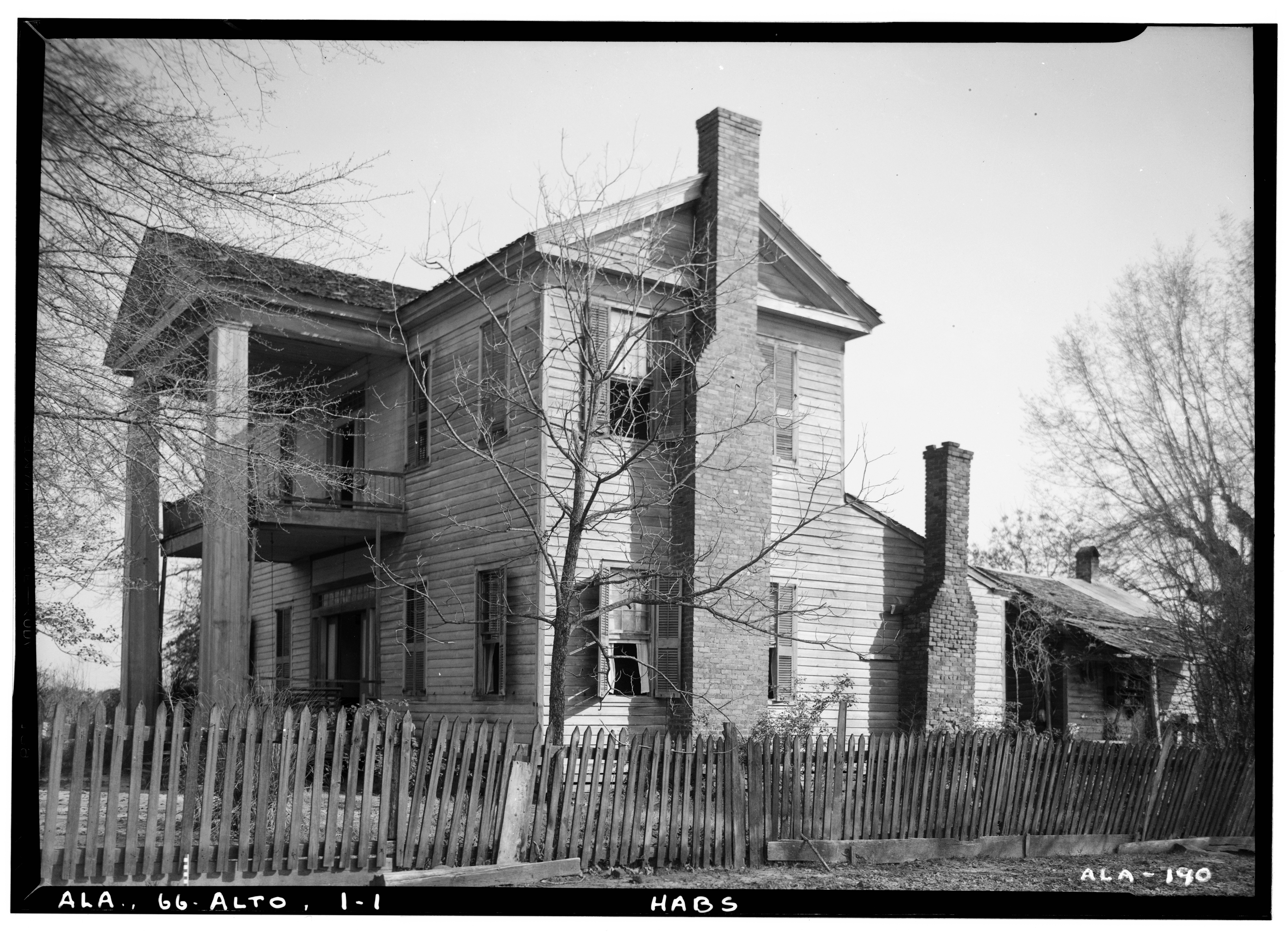
- Joshua B. Grace House, Allenton, 1937

- Location within the state of Alabama Allenton, Alabama (the United States)
- Coordinates: 31°56′12.5″N 87°03′11.9″W
- Country: United States
- State: Alabama
- County: Wilcox
- Elevation: 292 ft (89 m)
- Time zone: UTC-6 (Central (CST))
  - Summer (DST): UTC-5 (CDT)
- ZIP code: 36768
- Area code: 334

Allenton is an unincorporated community in Wilcox County, Alabama, United States.

== Geography ==
Allenton is located at 31.5613°N 08.70312°W and has an elevation of 292 feet (89 m).

== Demographics ==
=== Allenton ===
Historical population
Census	Pop.	Note	%±
1880	177		—
U.S. Decennial Census

Allenton first appeared on the 1880 U.S. Census as an unincorporated village. It has not appeared separately on the census since.

=== Historic Demographics ===
Census Year	Population	State Place Rank	County Place Rank
1880 (Note: 1st year Allenton reported on census)	177 (-) (Note: (-)Indicates no immediate prior population figure or rank) (Note: Racial demographics not reported for places of less than 2,500 on 1880 census.)	115th (-)	3rd (-)

== Allenton Precinct (1870-1950) ==
Historical population
Census	Pop.	Note	%±
1870	1,954		—
1880	2,215		13.4%
1890	2,109		−4.8%
1900	1,982		−6.0%
1910	1,615		−18.5%
1920	1,281		−20.7%
1930	995		−22.3%
1940	1,066		7.1%
1950	914		−14.3%
U.S. Decennial Census

The beat (precinct) containing Allenton first appeared on the 1870 U.S. Census as Allenton-9th Beat of Wilcox County. It continued to report as the 9th precinct until 1950. In 1960, the precincts were merged and/or reorganized into census divisions (as part of a general reorganization of counties) and it was consolidated into the census division of Pine Apple.
