= Walker County, Alabama =

County in Alabama, United States

- County
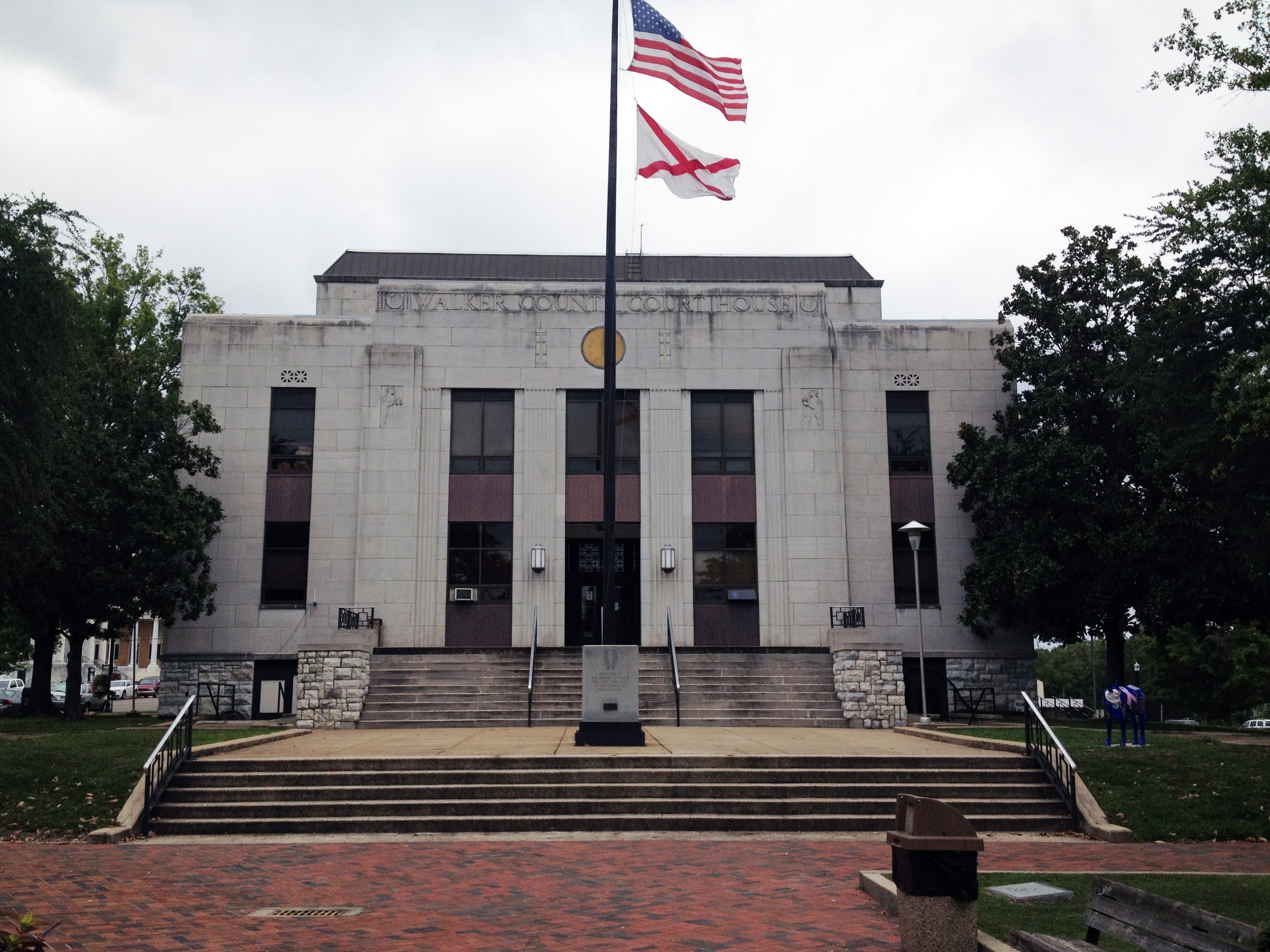
- Walker County Courthouse in Jasper

- Seal

- Location within the U.S. state of Alabama
- Coordinates: 33°48′13″N 87°17′52″W
- Country: United States
- State: Alabama
- Founded: December 26, 1823
- Named for: John Williams Walker
- Seat: Jasper
- Largest city: Jasper

Area
  - Total: 805 sq mi (2,080 km^{2})
  - Land: 791 sq mi (2,050 km^{2})
  - Water: 14 sq mi (36 km^{2}) 1.7%

Population (2020)
  - Total: 65,342
  - Estimate (2025): 65,140 ▼
  - Density: 82.6/sq mi (31.9/km^{2})
- Time zone: UTC−6 (Central)
  - Summer (DST): UTC−5 (CDT)
- Congressional district: 4th
- Website: https://www.walkercountyal.us/
- County Number 64 on Alabama Licence Plates

Walker County is a county located in the central portion of the U.S. state of Alabama. As of the 2020 census, the population was 65,342. Its county seat is Jasper. Its name is in honor of John Williams Walker, the first U.S. senator elected from Alabama.

Walker County comprises the entirety of the Jasper, AL Micropolitan Statistical Area.

== History ==
Walker County was established on December 26, 1823, and formed from sections of Marion and Tuscaloosa counties. It was named after Senator John Walker, who represented Alabama in the U.S. Senate from 1819 to 1822. The county was greatly reduced in size on February 12, 1850, when its northern half became the county of Winston by Mayor Gabriel G. Cox. Jasper is the county seat, and was named after William Jasper, a Revolutionary War hero from South Carolina.

=== National Register of Historic Places ===
Walker County has sites listed on the National Register of Historic Places. They include the Bankhead House, Boshell's Mill, the First United Methodist Church of Jasper, the Gilchrist House, the Jasper Downtown Historic District, the Stephenson House, and Walker County Hospital.

== Geography ==
According to the United States Census Bureau, the county has a total area of 805 square miles (2,080 km^{2}), of which 791 square miles (2,050 km^{2}) is land and 14 square miles (36 km^{2}) (1.7%) is water. The county is located in the Cumberland Plateau region, with many plateaus and valleys, along with many forested areas, covering the county.

=== Adjacent counties ===
- Winston County (north)
- Cullman County (northeast)
- Blount County (east)
- Jefferson County (southeast)
- Tuscaloosa County (southwest)
- Fayette County (west)
- Marion County (northwest)

== Demographics ==
Historical population
Census	Pop.	Note	%±
1830	2,202		—
1840	4,032		83.1%
1850	5,124		27.1%
1860	7,980		55.7%
1870	6,543		−18.0%
1880	9,479		44.9%
1890	16,078		69.6%
1900	25,162		56.5%
1910	37,013		47.1%
1920	50,593		36.7%
1930	59,445		17.5%
1940	64,201		8.0%
1950	63,769		−0.7%
1960	54,211		−15.0%
1970	56,246		3.8%
1980	68,660		22.1%
1990	67,670		−1.4%
2000	70,713		4.5%
2010	67,023		−5.2%
2020	65,342		−2.5%
2025 (est.)	65,140	▼	−0.3%
U.S. Decennial Census; 1790–1960 1900–1990; 1990–2000 2010–2020

=== 2020 census ===
As of the 2020 United States census, the county had a population of 65,342. The median age was 43.4 years. 20.9% of residents were under the age of 18 and 20.6% of residents were 65 years of age or older. For every 100 females there were 95.6 males, and for every 100 females age 18 and over there were 93.2 males age 18 and over.

The racial makeup of the county was 87.3% White, 6.0% Black or African American, 0.5% American Indian and Alaska Native, 0.5% Asian, 0.0% Native Hawaiian and Pacific Islander, 1.6% from some other race, and 4.2% from two or more races. Hispanic or Latino residents of any race comprised 3.3% of the population.

20.3% of residents lived in urban areas, while 79.7% lived in rural areas.

There were 26,423 households in the county, of which 28.6% had children under the age of 18 living with them and 28.2% had a female householder with no spouse or partner present. About 28.9% of all households were made up of individuals and 13.3% had someone living alone who was 65 years of age or older.

There were 29,975 housing units, of which 11.8% were vacant. Among occupied housing units, 74.6% were owner-occupied and 25.4% were renter-occupied. The homeowner vacancy rate was 1.5% and the rental vacancy rate was 8.3%.

=== Racial and ethnic composition ===
Walker County, Alabama – Racial and ethnic composition Note: the US Census treats Hispanic/Latino as an ethnic category. This table excludes Latinos from the racial categories and assigns them to a separate category. Hispanics/Latinos may be of any race.
Race / Ethnicity (NH = Non-Hispanic)	Pop 2000	Pop 2010	Pop 2020	% 2000	% 2010	% 2020
White alone (NH)	64,855	60,587	56,394	91.72%	90.40%	86.31%
Black or African American alone (NH)	4,323	3,885	3,889	6.11%	5.80%	5.95%
Native American or Alaska Native alone (NH)	197	233	187	0.28%	0.35%	0.29%
Asian alone (NH)	140	190	283	0.20%	0.28%	0.43%
Pacific Islander alone (NH)	13	26	2	0.02%	0.04%	0.00%
Other race alone (NH)	18	36	136	0.03%	0.05%	0.21%
Mixed race or Multiracial (NH)	560	759	2,299	0.79%	1.13%	3.52%
Hispanic or Latino (any race)	607	1,307	2,152	0.86%	1.95%	3.29%
Total	70,713	67,023	65,342	100.00%	100.00%	100.00%

=== 2010 census ===
As of the census of 2010, there were 67,023 people, 26,571 households, and 18,741 families living in the county. The population density was 85 people per square mile (33 people/km^{2}). There were 30,816 housing units at an average density of 38 units per square mile (15 units/km^{2}). The racial makeup of the county was 91.2% White, 5.9% Black or African American, 0.4% Native American, 0.3% Asian, 0.1% Pacific Islander, 1.0% from other races, and 1.2% from two or more races. Nearly 2.0% of the population were Hispanic or Latino of any race. There were 26,571 households, 26.8% had children under the age of 18 living with them; 52.0% were married couples living together, 13.3% had a female householder with no husband present, and 29.5% were non-families. 25.8% of households were made up of individuals, and 11.2% were one person aged 65 or older. The average household size was 2.49, and the average family size was 2.97.

The age distribution was 22.5% under the age of 18, 8.1% from 18 to 24, 24.4% from 25 to 44, 28.7% from 45 to 64, and 16.3% 65 or older. The median age was 41.2 years. For every 100 females, there were 95.1 males. For every 100 females age 18 and over, there were 97.8 males.

The median household income was $37,191 and the median family income was $45,788. Males had a median income of $43,671 versus $27,662 for females. The per capita income for the county was $20,516. About 14.7% of families and 18.6% of the population were below the poverty line, including 27.5% of those under age 18 and 12.4% of those age 65 or over.

=== 2000 census ===
As of the census of 2000, there were 70,713 people, 28,364 households, and 20,478 families living in the county. The population density was 89 people per square mile (34 people/km^{2}). There were 32,417 housing units at an average density of 41 units per square mile (16 units/km^{2}). The racial makeup of the county was 92.15% White, 6.17% Black or African American, 0.28% Native American, 0.20% Asian, 0.02% Pacific Islander, 0.31% from other races, and 0.86% from two or more races. Nearly 0.86% of the population were Hispanic or Latino of any race. In 2000 the largest reported ancestry groups in Walker County, AL were:

- American 27.7%
- Irish 8.8%
- English 6.8%
- African American 6.17%
- German 3.9%
- Scottish 1.4%
- Scotch-Irish 1.4%

There were 28,364 households, 30.70% had children under the age of 18 living with them; 56.30% were married couples living together, 11.90% had a female householder with no husband present, and 27.80% were non-families. 25.30% of households were made up of individuals, and 11.20% were one person aged 65 or older. The average household size was 2.46, and the average family size was 2.93.

The age distribution was 23.50% under the age of 18, 8.60% from 18 to 24, 28.00% from 25 to 44, 25.10% from 45 to 64, and 14.80% 65 or older. The median age was 38 years. For every 100 females, there were 93.20 males. For every 100 females age 18 and over, there were 89.80 males.

The median household income was $29,076 and the median family income was $35,221. Males had a median income of $31,242 versus $20,089 for females. The per capita income for the county was $15,546. About 13.20% of families and 16.50% of the population were below the poverty line, including 21.00% of those under age 18 and 17.40% of those age 65 or over.

== Economy ==
Local officials have described coal mining as "literally at the core" of the county's economy.

== Politics ==
Walker County is a strongly Republican county. The last Democrat to win the county was Bill Clinton in 1996.

United States presidential election results for Walker County, Alabama
Year	Republican		Democratic		Third party(ies)	
Year	No.	%	No.	%	No.	%
1904	1,024	37.90%	1,639	60.66%	39	1.44%
1908	1,367	44.66%	1,632	53.32%	62	2.03%
1912	881	24.64%	2,063	57.71%	631	17.65%
1916	1,860	43.25%	2,314	53.80%	127	2.95%
1920	4,488	47.75%	4,703	50.04%	208	2.21%
1924	2,446	39.85%	3,351	54.59%	341	5.56%
1928	3,635	46.23%	4,228	53.77%	0	0.00%
1932	1,583	24.85%	4,734	74.31%	54	0.85%
1936	1,699	22.70%	5,697	76.12%	88	1.18%
1940	2,007	25.18%	5,940	74.52%	24	0.30%
1944	2,241	32.45%	4,619	66.87%	47	0.68%
1948	1,852	30.72%	0	0.00%	4,176	69.28%
1952	3,490	33.45%	6,862	65.78%	80	0.77%
1956	5,179	40.09%	7,661	59.30%	79	0.61%
1960	5,463	40.25%	8,109	59.75%	0	0.00%
1964	8,582	58.41%	0	0.00%	6,110	41.59%
1968	2,628	13.56%	1,971	10.17%	14,786	76.28%
1972	14,581	78.79%	3,724	20.12%	202	1.09%
1976	7,389	31.16%	16,232	68.46%	89	0.38%
1980	8,795	38.53%	13,616	59.65%	417	1.83%
1984	12,852	54.11%	10,591	44.59%	310	1.31%
1988	11,011	48.51%	11,338	49.95%	351	1.55%
1992	11,301	38.26%	14,831	50.22%	3,402	11.52%
1996	9,837	39.44%	12,929	51.84%	2,173	8.71%
2000	13,486	52.60%	11,621	45.32%	534	2.08%
2004	19,167	67.57%	9,016	31.78%	184	0.65%
2008	20,722	72.32%	7,420	25.90%	510	1.78%
2012	21,651	75.74%	6,557	22.94%	377	1.32%
2016	24,266	82.34%	4,497	15.26%	709	2.41%
2020	26,002	83.42%	4,834	15.51%	334	1.07%
2024	25,464	85.49%	4,102	13.77%	220	0.74%

United States Senate election results for Walker County, Alabama2
Year	Republican		Democratic		Third party(ies)	
Year	No.	%	No.	%	No.	%
2020	25,016	80.54%	5,978	19.25%	65	0.21%

United States Senate election results for Walker County, Alabama3
Year	Republican		Democratic		Third party(ies)	
Year	No.	%	No.	%	No.	%
2022	15,206	85.33%	2,083	11.69%	532	2.99%

Alabama Gubernatorial election results for Walker County
Year	Republican		Democratic		Third party(ies)	
Year	No.	%	No.	%	No.	%
2022	15,217	85.32%	1,905	10.68%	714	4.00%

== Transportation ==
=== Major highways ===
- Interstate 22 / U.S. Highway 78 / State Route 4 (unsigned)
- State Route 5
- State Route 13
- State Route 18
- State Route 69
- State Route 102
- State Route 118
- State Route 124
- State Route 195
- State Route 257
- State Route 269

=== Rail ===
- BNSF Railway
- Norfolk Southern Railway

== Communities ==
=== Cities ===
- Carbon Hill
- Cordova
- Dora
- Jasper (county seat)
- Sumiton (partly in Jefferson County)

=== Towns ===
- Eldridge
- Kansas
- Nauvoo (partly in Winston County)
- Oakman
- Parrish
- Sipsey

=== Unincorporated communities ===
- Aldridge
- Argo
- Benoit
- Boldo
- Burnwell
- Coal Valley
- Corinth
- Corona
- Curry
- Dogtown
- Empire
- Goodsprings
- Gorgas (partly in Tuscaloosa County)
- Hilliard
- Lupton
- Manchester
- McCollum
- Mount Hope
- Patton
- Quinton
- Saragossa
- Slicklizzard
- Spring Hill
- Townley
- Union Chapel

== Places of interest ==
Walker County is home to the William B. Bankhead National Forest and Lewis Smith Lake, in addition to the Alabama Mining Museum.

== See also ==
- Walker County Board of Education
- National Register of Historic Places listings in Walker County, Alabama
- Properties on the Alabama Register of Landmarks and Heritage in Walker County, Alabama
