= Brownville, Alabama =

- Ghost town
- Location within Alabama
- Coordinates: 33°23′33″N 87°45′12″W
- Country: United States
- State: Alabama
- County: Tuscaloosa
- Elevation: 259 ft (79 m)
- Time zone: UTC-6 (Central (CST))
  - Summer (DST): UTC-5 (CDT)
- Area codes: 205, 659
- GNIS feature ID: 115026

Brownville, also known as Brownsville, Hog Eye, Red Valley, and Sulpher Springs, is a ghost town formerly located in Tuscaloosa County, Alabama, United States.

== History ==
The community was originally called Sulpher Springs, named for the nearby mineral springs. Later known as Hog Eye due to its small size, then known as Red Valley for the fact that most houses in the community were painted red. Finally known as Brownville in honor of W. P. Brown. In addition to the Brown Lumber Company, the Brown Wood Preserving Company was also located in Brownville. A post office operated under the name Brownville from 1926 to 1966, and Brownville Rural Station from 1966 to 1972.
