= Acton, Jefferson County, Alabama =

Unincorporated community in Alabama, United States

Acton, Alabama
- Unincorporated community
- Location within Alabama Location within the United States
- Coordinates: 33°25′36.4″N 86°44′07.0″W
- Country: United States
- State: Alabama
- County: Jefferson
- Elevation: 482 ft (147 m)
- Time zone: UTC-6 (Central (CST))
  - Summer (DST): UTC-5 (CDT)
- Zip Code: 35243
- Area codes: 205, 659
- GNIS feature ID: 112907

Acton is an unincorporated community in Jefferson County, in the U.S. state of Alabama. It is a suburban area bordering the city of Birmingham, centered around the intersection of Caldwell Mill Road and Old Looney Mill Road just west of the Cahaba River. It is not to be confused with the former mining village of Acton, Alabama in Shelby County (now within the city of Hoover, approximately 6 1/2 miles to the southwest as the crow flies. Initially, this Acton was also in Shelby County before a border adjustment shifted it into Jefferson County.

== Demographics/History ==
=== Acton Precinct (Shelby Co. Precinct 15 (1880)/Jefferson Co. Precinct 31 (1890-1950)) ===
Historical population
Census	Pop.	Note	%±
1880	600		—
1890	573		−4.5%
1900	762		33.0%
1910	1,154		51.4%
1920	1,017		−11.9%
1930	2,115		108.0%
1940	2,888		36.5%
1950	3,289		13.9%
U.S. Decennial Census

According to the census returns from 1850-2010 for Alabama, Acton village has never reported a population figure separately on the U.S. Census. However, the precinct it was located within did bear its name, at least initially. In 1880, it was Acton's Precinct 15 in Shelby County. In 1890, due to a border adjustment between Shelby & Jefferson Counties, Acton's Precinct was shifted into Jefferson County and renumbered the 31st Precinct. Although the precincts in Jefferson County were not named, for the purposes of population comparison, the figures for the 31st precinct from 1890 to 1950 were included in the population chart. In 1960, the precincts were merged and/or reorganized into census divisions (as part of a general reorganization of counties) and it was divided between the census divisions of Overton and Vestavia Hills. In 1980, both census divisions were abolished and the present area is in the Birmingham and partly within Leeds Census Divisions.
