= Acton, Alabama =

- Unincorporated community
- Location within Alabama Location within the United States
- Coordinates: 33°21′22″N 86°48′25″W
- Country: United States
- State: Alabama
- County: Shelby
- Elevation: 505 ft (154 m)
- Time zone: UTC-6 (Central (CST))
  - Summer (DST): UTC-5 (CDT)
- Zip Code: 35244
- Area codes: 205, 659
- GNIS feature ID: 112906

Acton is an unincorporated community in Shelby County, in the U.S. state of Alabama. It is partially located within the city of Hoover. It is not to be confused with the village of Acton, approximately 6 1/2 miles to the northeast in Jefferson County.

== History ==
Alabama Fuel & Iron Company established coal mines at Acton and the company town of Acton grew up around them. The mines were served by the Louisville and Nashville Railroad. On November 18, 1913, 21 miners were killed by an explosion in Mine Number 2. After the mines closed, the area was converted into the Riverchase real estate development.

A post office was established at Acton in 1908, and remained in operation until it was discontinued in 1926. The community was likely named for William Acton, a local businessperson in the mining industry.

In the 1970s, the land was developed into the Riverchase residential planned community, which was annexed into Hoover, Alabama in 1980.

== Demographics ==
=== Acton/Highland Precinct (1870-1950) ===
Historical population
Census	Pop.	Note	%±
1870	657		—
1880	494		−24.8%
1890	484		−2.0%
1900	444		−8.3%
1910	1,282		188.7%
1920	1,076		−16.1%
1930	746		−30.7%
1940	834		11.8%
1950	974		16.8%
U.S. Decennial Census

According to the census returns from 1850-2010 for Alabama, Acton village has never reported a population figure separately on the U.S. Census. Acton (Precinct 12 of Shelby County) first appeared on the 1920 U.S. Census (not to be confused with Acton's Precinct 15, which appeared in 1880 and was moved to Jefferson County, where the other Acton village is located). Acton Precinct only appeared under this name on this one occasion. Prior to 1920 and again from 1930 to 1950 the name was Highland Precinct, which first appeared on the 1870 census as Shelby County Beat 4 and then Beat/Precinct 12 from 1880-onwards. In 1960, the precincts were merged and/or reorganized into census divisions (as part of a general reorganization of counties) and it was consolidated into the census division of Helena. In 1980, that census division was consolidated into the new division of Alabaster-Helena.
