= Benoit, Alabama =

- Unincorporated community
- Location within Alabama Location within the United States
- Coordinates: 33°45′14″N 87°09′26″W
- Country: United States
- State: Alabama
- County: Walker
- Elevation: 302 ft (92 m)
- Time zone: UTC-6 (Central (CST))
  - Summer (DST): UTC-5 (CDT)
- Area codes: 205, 659
- GNIS feature ID: 113930

Benoit is an unincorporated community in Walker County, Alabama, United States.
