= Burnt Corn, Alabama =

- Unincorporated community
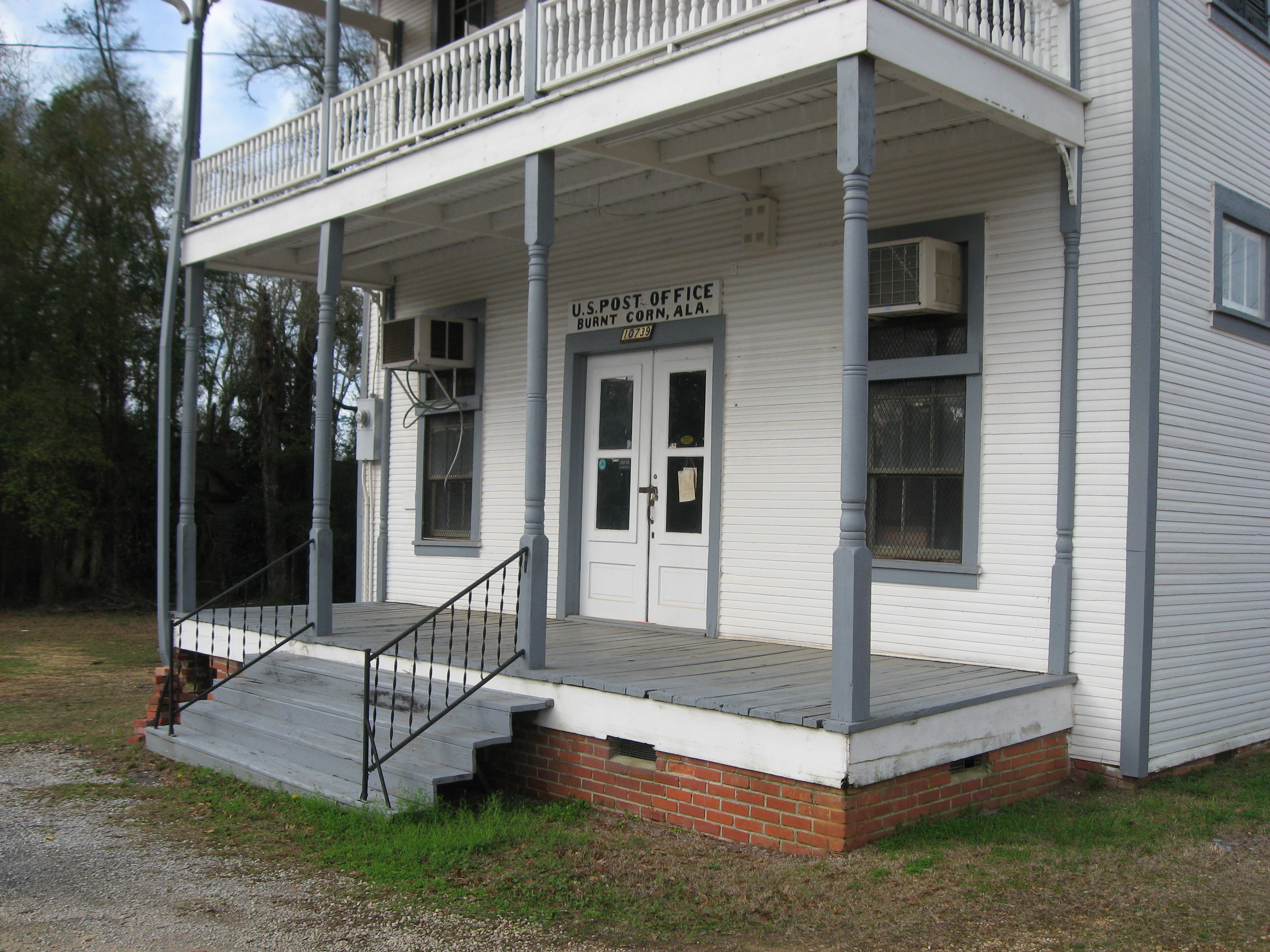
- Former Lowrey's General Store and Post Office

- Location within Alabama Location within the United States
- Coordinates: 31°33′13″N 87°9′37″W
- Country: United States
- State: Alabama
- County: Monroe
- Elevation: 427 ft (130 m)
- Time zone: UTC-6 (CST)
  - Summer (DST): UTC-6 (EDT)
- ZIP codes: 36401
- Area code: 251
- GNIS feature ID: 115265

Burnt Corn is an unincorporated community on the boundary between Monroe County and Conecuh County in Alabama, United States. It is located near the source of Burnt Corn Creek, at the intersection of two historic trading paths. It has been noted for its unusual name.

== History ==
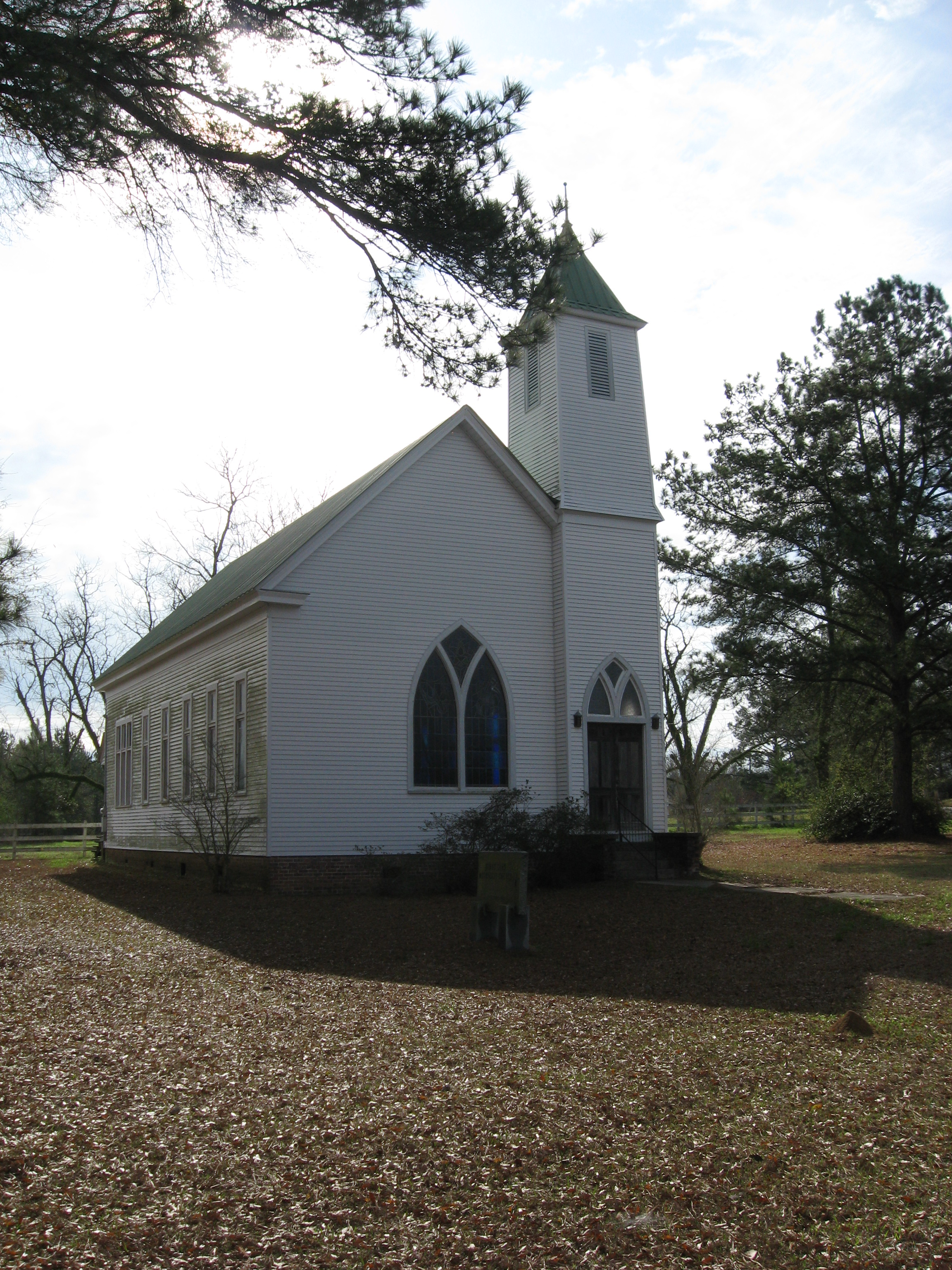
Burnt Corn Methodist Church

The settlement and the creek may have been named for an incident in which passersby found a pile of parched corn, a food often used by Creek Indians when traveling, although the oral tradition of some Burnt Corn families holds that the name came from the burning of corn fields as part of the scorched earth policies during the Creek War in the early 1800s. Those same oral traditions say that nearby Murder Creek was named because victims of the Creek War were thrown into the creek during the conflict.

In 1798, the area was included in the Mississippi Territory but was controlled by the Creek Nation. Between 1805 and 1811 the area became a stop on the Federal Road through the Creek Nation. Burnt Corn was a regular stopping point for stage coaches traveling between the east and the port cities along the Gulf Coast.

The Battle of Burnt Corn, an episode of the Creek War in July 1813, did not occur at Burnt Corn, but at a ford of Burnt Corn Creek to the south, in present-day Escambia County, Alabama. When the Creek Nation was forced to cede land to the United States in 1815, Burnt Corn Spring was included in a 640-acre (2.6 km^{2}) land grant to Jim Cornells, a Creek Indian who fought on the U.S. side in the war.

U.S. postal service to Burnt Corn began in 1817, when the village also became part of the Alabama Territory. The post office was closed in 2002 and the 36431 ZIP code retired. Structures in Burnt Corn include Lowrey General Store, where the post office had been located, a Masonic lodge, and the Duck Waters Barber Shop.

== Demographics ==
Burnt Corn appeared on the 1880 U.S. Census with a population of 33 residents. This was the only time it appeared on the census.
