= Mount Hope, Walker County, Alabama =

Mount Hope, Alabama
- Unincorporated community
- Location within Alabama Location within the United States
- Coordinates: 33°46′09″N 87°14′28″W
- Country: United States
- State: Alabama
- County: Walker
- Elevation: 331 ft (101 m)
- Time zone: UTC-6 (Central (CST))
  - Summer (DST): UTC-5 (CDT)
- Area codes: 205, 659
- GNIS feature ID: 123224

Mount Hope is an unincorporated community in Walker County, Alabama, United States.
