= Dora, Alabama =

City in Alabama, United States

- City
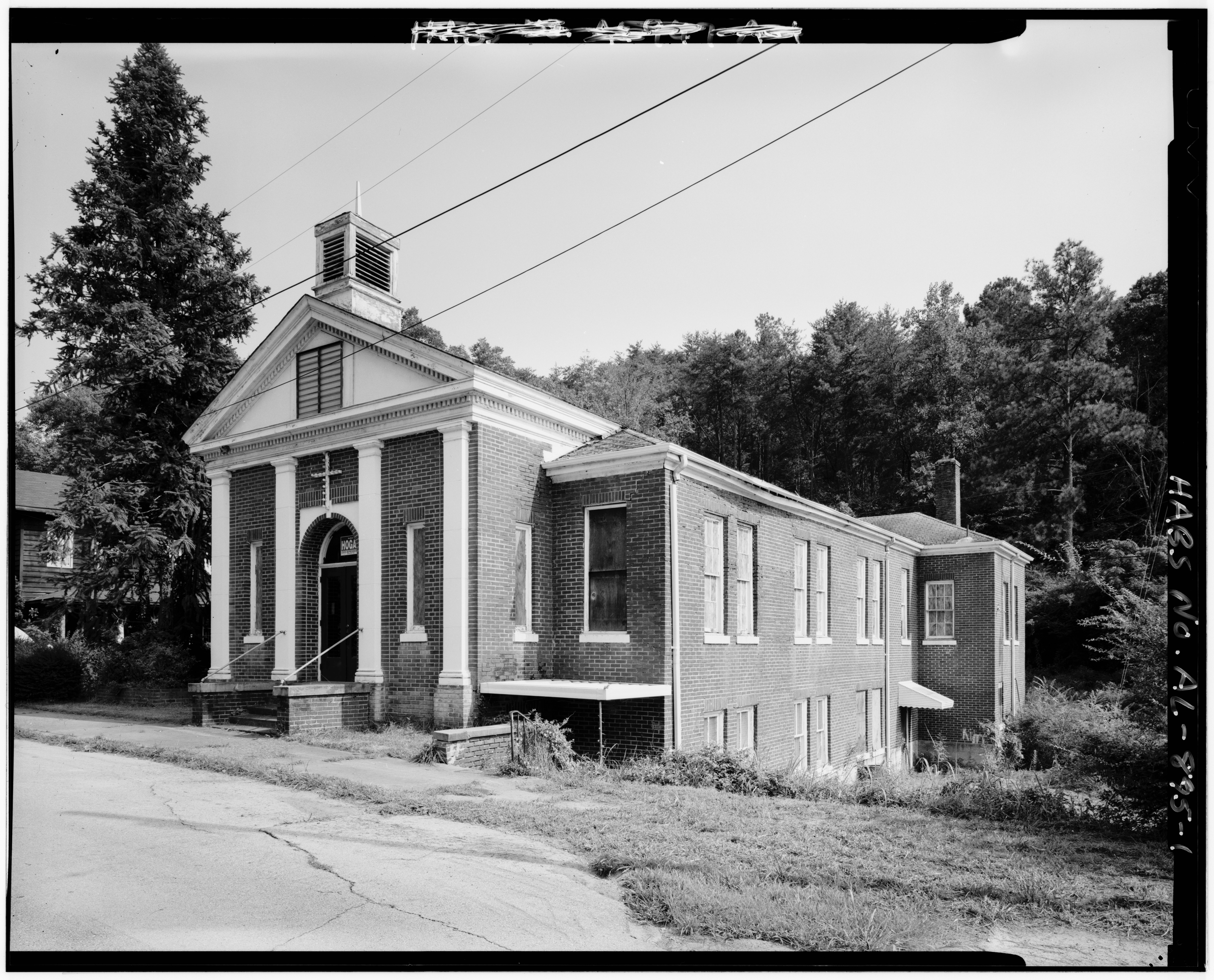
- Old Methodist Church, taken as part of the Historic American Buildings Survey

- Seal

- Location of Dora in Walker County, Alabama.
- Coordinates: 33°44′23″N 87°04′45″W
- Country: United States
- State: Alabama
- County: Walker

Area
  - Total: 7.92 sq mi (20.51 km^{2})
  - Land: 7.91 sq mi (20.49 km^{2})
  - Water: 0.012 sq mi (0.03 km^{2})
- Elevation: 384 ft (117 m)

Population (2020)
  - Total: 2,297
  - Density: 290.4/sq mi (112.13/km^{2})
- Time zone: UTC-6 (Central (CST))
  - Summer (DST): UTC-5 (CDT)
- ZIP code: 35062
- Area codes: 205 and 659
- FIPS code: 01-21136
- GNIS feature ID: 2404235
- Website: www.cityofdora.com

Dora is a city in Walker County, Alabama, United States. As of the 2020 census, Dora had a population of 2,297. Coal mining took place in the area.

== History ==
The first settlers in the area now known as Dora were James. M. Davis, Ezekiel Morgan, and Cole Smith in the early 1830s. Later in the 1830s, homesteaders settled here. The Kansas City, Memphis and Birmingham Railroad laid a line through the settlement in 1886, and called their depot "Sharon". The Magella Coal Company and the Horse Creek Coal and Coke Company were founded, and by 1890, the area was called Horse Creek and incorporated as the town of Horse Creek in 1897. By 1900, several coal mines were located nearby. There was a school, churches, businesses and doctors. The name was changed to Dora in 1906. In 2023, Dora annexed a large tract of land that adjoined it to I-22 at exit 78, where developments are underway. This is the first time in its history that Dora has had direct interstate access. At the 2020 census the population was 2,297, up from 2,024 in 2010.

== Geography ==
According to the U.S. Census Bureau, the city has a total area of 7.5 square miles (19 km^{2}), all land.

== Demographics ==
Historical population
| Census | Pop. | Note | %± |
|---|---|---|---|
| 1900 | 385 | | — |
| 1910 | 916 | | 137.9% |
| 1920 | 1,117 | | 21.9% |
| 1930 | 1,143 | | 2.3% |
| 1940 | 1,032 | | −9.7% |
| 1950 | 984 | | −4.7% |
| 1960 | 1,776 | | 80.5% |
| 1970 | 1,862 | | 4.8% |
| 1980 | 2,327 | | 25.0% |
| 1990 | 2,214 | | −4.9% |
| 2000 | 2,413 | | 9.0% |
| 2010 | 2,025 | | −16.1% |
| 2020 | 2,297 | | 13.4% |
U.S. Decennial Census; 2013 Estimate

=== Racial and ethnic composition ===
Dora city, Alabama – Racial and ethnic composition Note: the US Census treats Hispanic/Latino as an ethnic category. This table excludes Latinos from the racial categories and assigns them to a separate category. Hispanics/Latinos may be of any race. Race and ethnicity was not surveyed for populations under 2,500 in the 1980 census and under 1,000 in 1990 census.
| Race / Ethnicity (NH = Non-Hispanic) | Pop 1990 | Pop 2000 | Pop 2010 | Pop 2020 | % 1990 | % 2000 | % 2010 | % 2020 |
|---|---|---|---|---|---|---|---|---|
| White alone (NH) | 1,883 | 1,944 | 1,730 | 1,817 | 85.05% | 80.56% | 85.43% | 79.10% |
| Black or African American alone (NH) | 314 | 402 | 244 | 326 | 14.18% | 16.66% | 12.05% | 14.19% |
| Native American or Alaska Native alone (NH) | 7 | 7 | 7 | 6 | 0.32% | 0.29% | 0.35% | 0.26% |
| Asian alone (NH) | 2 | 5 | 1 | 24 | 0.09% | 0.21% | 0.05% | 1.04% |
| Native Hawaiian or Pacific Islander alone (NH) | x | 2 | 2 | 0 | x | 0.08% | 0.10% | 0.00% |
| Other race alone (NH) | 0 | 0 | 1 | 4 | 0.00% | 0.00% | 0.05% | 0.17% |
| Mixed race or Multiracial (NH) | x | 50 | 26 | 104 | x | 2.07% | 1.28% | 4.53% |
| Hispanic or Latino (any race) | 8 | 3 | 14 | 16 | 0.36% | 0.12% | 0.69% | 0.70% |
| Total | 2,214 | 2,413 | 2,025 | 2,297 | 100.00% | 100.00% | 100.00% | 100.00% |

=== 2020 census ===
As of the 2020 census, Dora had a population of 2,297. The median age was 41.3 years. 22.6% of residents were under the age of 18 and 18.7% of residents were 65 years of age or older. For every 100 females there were 87.5 males, and for every 100 females age 18 and over there were 84.0 males age 18 and over.

0.0% of residents lived in urban areas, while 100.0% lived in rural areas.

There were 920 households and 596 families in Dora; 33.4% of households had children under the age of 18 living in them. Of all households, 42.3% were married-couple households, 18.3% were households with a male householder and no spouse or partner present, and 33.6% were households with a female householder and no spouse or partner present. About 27.4% of all households were made up of individuals and 11.6% had someone living alone who was 65 years of age or older.

There were 1,005 housing units, of which 8.5% were vacant. The homeowner vacancy rate was 1.1% and the rental vacancy rate was 4.2%.

=== 2010 census ===
At the 2010 census there were 2,025 people, 820 households, and 575 families living in the city. The population density was 270 inhabitants per square mile (100/km^{2}). There were 959 housing units at an average density of 127.9 per square mile (49.4/km^{2}). The racial makeup of the city was 85.6% White, 12.2% Black or African American, 0.3% Native American, 0% Asian, 0.1% Pacific Islander, 0.3% from other races, and 1.3% from two or more races. 0.7% of the population were Hispanic or Latino of any race. Of the 820 households 27.0% had children under the age of 18 living with them, 48.8% were married couples living together, 17.1% had a female householder with no husband present, and 29.9% were non-families. 27.2% of households were one person and 11.3% were one person aged 65 or older. The average household size was 2.47 and the average family size was 2.98.

The age distribution was 23.6% under the age of 18, 8.4% from 18 to 24, 26.3% from 25 to 44, 25.5% from 45 to 64, and 16.2% 65 or older. The median age was 39.2 years. For every 100 females, there were 91.4 males. For every 100 females age 18 and over, there were 97.6 males.

The median household income was $26,596 and the median family income was $37,946. Males had a median income of $35,586 versus $22,652 for females. The per capita income for the city was $18,902. About 29.0% of families and 25.0% of the population were below the poverty line, including 42.3% of those under age 18 and 3.1% of those age 65 or over.

The city is home to Dora High School with students from Elementary and Middle Schools in Sumiton. The mascot for the high school is the bulldog and it is a member of the Walker County Board of Education.

=== 2000 census ===
At the 2000 census there were 2,413 people, 984 households, and 711 families living in the city. The population density was 319.9 inhabitants per square mile (123.5/km^{2}). There were 1,080 housing units at an average density of 143.2 per square mile (55.3/km^{2}). The racial makeup of the city was 80.61% White, 16.66% Black or African American, 0.29% Native American, 0.21% Asian, 0.08% Pacific Islander, 0.08% from other races, and 2.07% from two or more races. 0.12% of the population were Hispanic or Latino of any race. Of the 984 households 32.9% had children under the age of 18 living with them, 50.3% were married couples living together, 18.8% had a female householder with no husband present, and 27.7% were non-families. 25.3% of households were one person and 11.8% were one person aged 65 or older. The average household size was 2.45 and the average family size was 2.93.

The age distribution was 26.2% under the age of 18, 8.8% from 18 to 24, 26.5% from 25 to 44, 25.1% from 45 to 64, and 13.5% 65 or older. The median age was 36 years. For every 100 females, there were 81.8 males. For every 100 females age 18 and over, there were 80.3 males.

The median household income was $21,458 and the median family income was $29,000. Males had a median income of $28,942 versus $19,886 for females. The per capita income for the city was $14,560. About 23.1% of families and 27.9% of the population were below the poverty line, including 39.0% of those under age 18 and 23.5% of those age 65 or over.

== Administration ==
Mayor: Hezekiah Walker

== Schools ==
Dora High School (330 Glenn C Gant Cir, Dora, AL 35062)

== Parks and recreation ==
Dora has one city park located behind city hall. Its facilities include tennis, pickleball, and basketball courts, a walking track, a playground with pavilions, batting cages, and three baseball fields of varying sizes. The park also allows easy access to a public pond and the Horse Creek Walking Trail. (1485 Sharon Blvd, Dora AL, 35062)

Dora also owns and operates the Horse Creek Golf Course, an 18-hole, par-72 golf course that opened in September 2000. In June 2017, a new clubhouse was erected which includes a large event venue, a complete pro shop, and snack bar. (1745 Hwy 78, Dora AL, 35062)

The Horse Creek Walking Trail is a paved, lighted 2.5 mile walking/cycling trail that starts at the Horse Creek Golf Course and ends at the City of Lights Dream Center. The city park is accessible from this trail.

== Police Department ==
Dora offers 24-hour police protection with seven active full-time police officers, including chief Jared Hall, who has served as the chief of police since 2015. The police department and city jail are located at city hall.

== Fire Department ==
Dora Fire and Rescue is a volunteer fire department led by chief Adrean Booth.

== Notable people ==
- Ivy Andrews, former Major League Baseball pitcher
- Terry Fell, country music singer
- Sybil Gibson, painter
- Howard Goodman (gospel singer), gospel music
- Chavis Williams, former linebacker for the Baltimore Ravens

== See also ==
- Birmingham District
