= Boldo, Alabama =

- Unincorporated community
- Location within Alabama Location within the United States
- Coordinates: 33°51′14″N 87°10′58″W
- Country: United States
- State: Alabama
- County: Walker
- Elevation: 463 ft (141 m)

Population
  - Total: approx. 500
- Time zone: UTC-6 (Central (CST))
  - Summer (DST): UTC-5 (CDT)
- Postal code: 35504
- Area codes: 205, 659
- GNIS feature ID: 114684

Boldo is an unincorporated community in Walker County, Alabama, United States. Boldo is located along Alabama State Route 69, 6 miles (9.7 km) north-northeast of Jasper.

== History ==
Boldo was named after a proud young deer or "bold doe" as noted by Willie Barton in her book about the history of Boldo called "Tracks of a Bold Doe". A post office operated under the name Boldo from 1878 to 1904. Boldo was formerly home to Boldo School, which served as a location for teaching vocational agriculture as outlined in the Smith–Hughes Act. Around 1876 Leroy Williams build a Mill on Blackwater Creek, known as Williams Mill. In 1903, the Boldo Grist Mill served as a flour and grist mill for people of the surrounding area.

== Schools ==
Boldo Junior High School (1908-1981) "Bulldogs"

== Local attractions ==
Dixie Saddle Club - Boldo Lions Club
