= Argo, Walker County, Alabama =

Argo, Alabama
- Unincorporated community
- Location within Alabama Location within the United States
- Coordinates: 33°48′05″N 87°07′01″W
- Country: United States
- State: Alabama
- County: Walker
- Elevation: 407 ft (124 m)
- Time zone: UTC-6 (Central (CST))
  - Summer (DST): UTC-5 (CDT)
- Area codes: 205/659
- GNIS feature ID: 113205

Argo is an unincorporated community in Walker County, Alabama, United States. Argo is located on U.S. Route 78, 4.7 miles (7.6 km) northwest of Sumiton.

== Demographics ==
According to the returns from 1850-2010 for Alabama, it has never reported a population figure separately on the U.S. Census.
