= Coal Valley, Alabama =

- Unincorporated community
- Location within Alabama Location within the United States
- Coordinates: 33°44′24″N 87°25′05″W
- Country: United States
- State: Alabama
- County: Walker
- Elevation: 367 ft (112 m)
- Time zone: UTC-6 (Central (CST))
  - Summer (DST): UTC-5 (CDT)
- Area codes: 205, 659
- GNIS feature ID: 116306

Coal Valley, also known as Cormick, is an unincorporated community in Walker County, Alabama, United States.

== History ==
Coal Valley is named for the abundance of coal in the surrounding area. Coal mines were opened in Coal Valley after the completion of the Georgia Pacific Railway. The Coal Valley mines played a role in the 1920 Alabama coal strike. A post office operated under the name Cormick from 1890 to 1891 and under the name Coal Valley from 1891 to 1951.
