= Eldridge, Alabama =

- Town
- Seal

- Location of Eldridge in Walker County, Alabama.
- Coordinates: 33°55′16″N 87°37′28″W
- Country: United States
- State: Alabama
- County: Walker

Area
  - Total: 0.70 sq mi (1.81 km^{2})
  - Land: 0.70 sq mi (1.81 km^{2})
  - Water: 0 sq mi (0.00 km^{2})
- Elevation: 594 ft (181 m)

Population (2020)
  - Total: 136
  - Density: 194.2/sq mi (74.98/km^{2})
- Time zone: UTC-6 (Central (CST))
  - Summer (DST): UTC-5 (CDT)
- ZIP code: 35554
- Area codes: 205, 659
- FIPS code: 01-23344
- GNIS feature ID: 2406431

Eldridge is a town in Walker County, Alabama, United States. It was incorporated in 1972. As of the 2020 census, Eldridge had a population of 136.

== History ==
A unit of Gen. James H. Wilson's cavalry corps, under the command of Brig.-Gen. Edward M. McCook, passed through Eldridge while en route to Jasper and Selma, during the Civil War in March 1865. Upon hearing of the advance of the Union forces, residents in Eldridge were obliged to conceal their home valuables by burying them in the ground.

== Geography ==
According to the U.S. Census Bureau, the town has a total area of 0.7 square miles (1.8 km^{2}), all land.

== Demographics ==
Historical population
| Census | Pop. | Note | %± |
|---|---|---|---|
| 1970 | 249 | | — |
| 1980 | 230 | | −7.6% |
| 1990 | 225 | | −2.2% |
| 2000 | 184 | | −18.2% |
| 2010 | 130 | | −29.3% |
| 2020 | 136 | | 4.6% |
U.S. Decennial Census; 2013 Estimate

As of the census of 2000, there were 184 people, 69 households, and 52 families residing in the town. The population density was 262.9 inhabitants per square mile (101.5/km^{2}). There were 79 housing units at an average density of 112.9 per square mile (43.6/km^{2}). The racial makeup of the town was 95.65% White and 4.35% Black or African American. 2.17% of the population were Hispanic or Latino of any race.

There were 69 households, out of which 21.7% had children under the age of 18 living with them, 53.6% were married couples living together, 15.9% had a female householder with no husband present, and 24.6% were non-families. 24.6% of all households were made up of individuals, and 18.8% had someone living alone who was 65 years of age or older. The average household size was 2.33 and the average family size was 2.71.

In the town, the population was spread out, with 28.8% under the age of 18, 8.7% from 18 to 24, 21.2% from 25 to 44, 18.5% from 45 to 64, and 22.8% who were 65 years of age or older. The median age was 36 years. For every 100 females, there were 84.0 males. For every 100 females age 18 and over, there were 65.8 males.

The median income for a household in the town was $30,250, and the median income for a family was $35,313. Males had a median income of $26,875 versus $24,167 for females. The per capita income for the town was $18,227. About 5.5% of families and 13.6% of the population were below the poverty line, including 29.2% of those under the age of eighteen and 11.1% of those 65 or over.

== Notable person ==
- E. S. Campbell, former United States Merchant Marine and vice president of Radio Free Europe
