= Aldridge, Alabama =

- Unincorporated community
- Location within Alabama Location within the United States
- Coordinates: 33°42′25″N 87°14′31″W
- Country: United States
- State: Alabama
- County: Walker
- Elevation: 446 ft (136 m)
- Time zone: UTC-6 (Central (CST))
  - Summer (DST): UTC-5 (CDT)
- Area codes: 205, 659
- GNIS feature ID: 112977

Aldridge is an unincorporated community in Walker County, in the U.S. state of Alabama.

The community has the name of the local Aldridge family. A variant name was "Stith".

== Demographics ==
According to the returns from 1850-2010 for Alabama, it has never reported a population figure separately on the U.S. Census.
