= Townley, Alabama =

- Unincorporated community
- Location in Alabama Location in the United States
- Coordinates: 33.82899°N 87.43167°W
- Country: United States
- State: Alabama
- County: Walker
- Elevation: 338 ft (103 m)
- Time zone: UTC-6 (Central (CST))
  - Summer (DST): UTC-5 (CDT)
- ZIP code: 35587
- Area codes: 205 and 659

Townley is an unincorporated community in Walker County, Alabama, United States. It was formerly an incorporated town from 1895 until the 1920s. Townley has one site on the National Register of Historic Places, Boshell's Mill.

== Demographics ==
Historical population
Census	Pop.	Note	%±
1900	124		—
1910	235		89.5%
1920	1,554		561.3%
U.S. Decennial Census

Townley, a coal-mining town, was initially incorporated in 1895. It appeared on the next three consecutive U.S. Censuses, reaching its zenith in 1920, when it became the 4th largest town in Walker County, with 1,554 residents. At some point after 1920 the coal mine shut down and the town either disincorporated or lost its charter, and has not appeared on census rolls since.

== Geography ==
Townley is located at an elevation of 338 feet (103 m). Its geographical location is in Walker County, Alabama, United States, North America

== Notable people ==
- Tom Bevill, Democratic fifteen-term U.S. congressman who represented Alabama's 4th Congressional District and Alabama's 7th congressional district from 1967 to 1997
- Carter Manasco, U.S. Representative from 1941 to 1949
