= Walker County Board of Education =

School district in Alabama, United States

Coordinates: 33°50′03.0″N 87°16′29.9″W

The Walker County Board of Education is the governing body over the public schools in Walker County, Alabama, United States.

== Member schools ==
- Bankhead Middle School
- Carbon Hill Elementary/Junior High School
- Carbon Hill High School
- Cordova Elementary School
- Cordova High School
- Curry Elementary School
- Curry Middle School
- Curry High School
- Dora High School
- Farmstead Elementary/Junior High School
- Lupton Elementary/Junior High School
- Oakman Elementary School
- Oakman High School
- Parrish Elementary School
- Sumiton Elementary/Junior High School
- Townley Elementary/Junior High School
- Valley Elementary/Junior High School
- Walker County Alternative School
- Walker County Center of Technology

=== Closed/Former ===
- Parrish High School (closed in 2014)
- Sipsey Elementary/Junior High School (closed in 2014)
- T.S. Boyd Elementary/Junior High School (closed in 2014)

== Failing schools ==
Statewide testing ranks the schools in Alabama. Those in the bottom six percent are listed as "failing." As of early 2018, Carbon Hill High School was included in this category.
