= Oakman, Alabama =

- Town
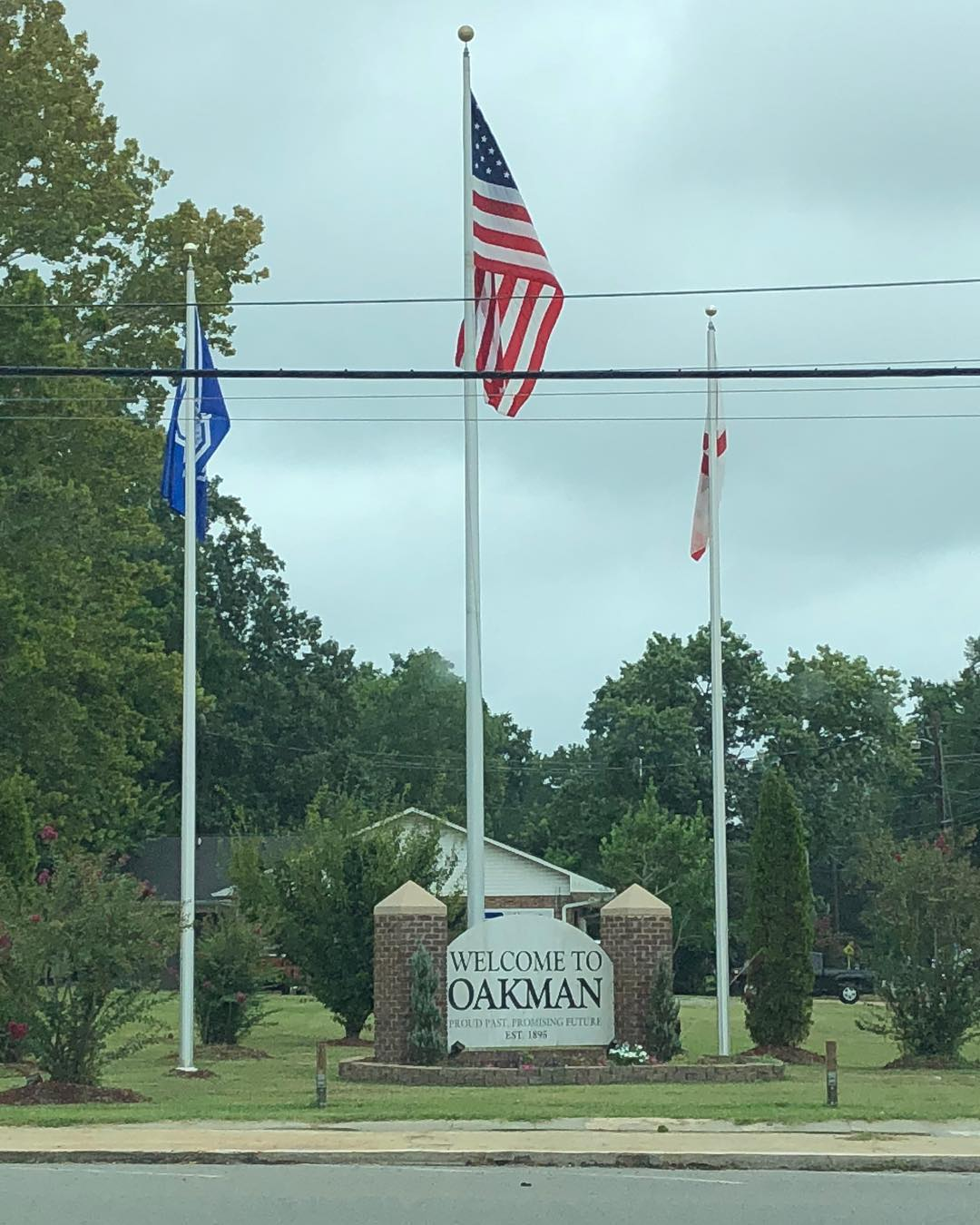
- Entrance sign for Oakman

- Location of Oakman in Walker County, Alabama.
- Coordinates: 33°42′51″N 87°22′50″W
- Country: United States
- State: Alabama
- County: Walker

Area
  - Total: 3.09 sq mi (8.00 km^{2})
  - Land: 3.08 sq mi (7.98 km^{2})
  - Water: 0.0077 sq mi (0.02 km^{2})
- Elevation: 341 ft (104 m)

Population (2020)
  - Total: 771
  - Density: 250/sq mi (96.6/km^{2})
- Time zone: UTC-6 (Central (CST))
  - Summer (DST): UTC-5 (CDT)
- ZIP code: 35579
- Area codes: 205, 659
- FIPS code: 01-55992
- GNIS feature ID: 2407028

Oakman is a town in Walker County, Alabama, United States. At the 2020 census the population was 771, down from 789 in 2010. Initially named Day (or Day's) Gap, it was renamed Oakman and incorporated in 1895.

== Geography ==
According to the U.S. Census Bureau, the town has a total area of 3.1 square miles (8.0 km^{2}), all of it land. It is the only town in Alabama with perfectly round city limits.

== Demographics ==
Historical population
Census	Pop.	Note	%±
1890	421		—
1900	503		19.5%
1910	1,065		111.7%
1920	1,083		1.7%
1930	927		−14.4%
1940	897		−3.2%
1950	1,022		13.9%
1960	849		−16.9%
1970	853		0.5%
1980	770		−9.7%
1990	846		9.9%
2000	944		11.6%
2010	789		−16.4%
2020	771		−2.3%
U.S. Decennial Census; 2013 Estimate

Oakman first appeared on the 1890 census as the town of Day (or Day's) Gap. It changed its name in 1894 to Oakman and has remained since.

As of the census of 2000, there were 944 people, 386 households, and 265 families residing in the town. The population density was 303.1 inhabitants per square mile (117.0/km^{2}). There were 449 housing units at an average density of 144.1 per square mile (55.6/km^{2}). The racial makeup of the town was 79.66% White, 19.60% Black or African American, and 0.74% from two or more races. 0.74% of the population were Hispanic or Latino of any race.

There were 386 households, out of which 34.2% had children under the age of 18 living with them, 46.9% were married couples living together, 16.1% had a female householder with no husband present, and 31.3% were non-families. 28.0% of all households were made up of individuals, and 15.3% had someone living alone who was 65 years of age or older. The average household size was 2.45 and the average family size was 3.02.

In the town, the population was spread out, with 28.9% under the age of 18, 6.9% from 18 to 24, 27.3% from 25 to 44, 23.6% from 45 to 64, and 13.2% who were 65 years of age or older. The median age was 36 years. For every 100 females, there were 93.0 males. For every 100 females age 18 and over, there were 87.4 males.

The median income for a household in the town was $22,014, and the median income for a family was $31,964. Males had a median income of $25,221 versus $17,321 for females. The per capita income for the town was $11,936. About 17.4% of families and 20.2% of the population were below the poverty line, including 22.6% of those under age 18 and 26.1% of those age 65 or over.

== Education ==
Oakman High School serves 301 students in grades 9-12. Its mascot is the Wildcats, and the school colors are blue and white. It is a member of the Walker County Board of Education. In addition, approximately 800 students in grades Pre-K through 8 attend Oakman Elementary/Middle School.

=== Sports ===
In 2003 the Wildcats' varsity football team was the 2A Region 4 Champions, had an undefeated record in the regular season, and went to the 2nd round of State Playoffs. In 2005 they went to the 1st round of State Playoffs. In 2007 the Girls Softball Team won the 2A State Championship. In 1983 the Wildcats varsity football 1A team beat Oakgrove the 2A state champs that year.
