= List of places in Alabama: N–R =

This list of current cities, towns, unincorporated communities, counties, and other recognized places in the U.S. state of Alabama also includes information on the number of counties in which the place lies, the name of its principal county, and its lower and upper ZIP Code bounds, if applicable.

== See also ==
- Alabama
- List of cities in Alabama
- List of counties in Alabama

== N ==
Name of place	Number of counties	Principal county	Lower zip code	Upper zip code
Nadawah	1	Monroe County	36726	
Naftel	1	Montgomery County	36046	
Naheola	1	Choctaw County		
Nanafalia	1	Marengo County	36764	
Nances Creek	1	Calhoun County	36272	
Napier Field	1	Dale County	36303	
Napoleon	1	Randolph County	36278	
Nat	1	Jackson County	35776	
Natchez	1	Monroe County	36425	
Natchez Trace Parkway	1	Tallapoosa County	38801	
Nathan	1	Winston County	35541	
Natis	1	Winston County		
Natural Bridge	1	Winston County	35577	
Nauvoo	2	Walker County	35578	
Nauvoo	2	Winston County	35578	
Navco	1	Mobile County		
Nave	1	Perry County		
Nebo	1	Madison County		
Nectar	1	Blount County	35049	
Needham	1	Choctaw County	36915	
Needmore	1	Clay County		
Needmore	1	Lawrence County		
Needmore	1	Marshall County	35957	
Needmore	1	Pike County	36081	
Needmore	1	Winston County	35565	
Neel	1	Morgan County	35640	
Neely	1	Mobile County		
Neenah	1	Wilcox County	36726	
Neighbors Mill	1	Marshall County		
Nellie	1	Wilcox County	36726	
Nelson	1	Chambers County		
Nelson	1	Shelby County		
Nelson Heights	1	Jefferson County		
Neman	1	Elmore County		
Nenemoosha	1	Mobile County		
Neshota	1	Mobile County		
Nesmith	1	Cullman County	35055	
Ne Smith	1	Lawrence County	35672	
Nettleboro	1	Clarke County	36436	
Newala	1	Shelby County		
Newbern	1	Hale County	36765	
Newberry Crossroads	1	Cherokee County	35960	
New Bingham	1	Elmore County		
New Brashier Chapel	1	Marshall County	35950	
New Brockton	1	Coffee County	36351	
Newburg	1	Franklin County	35653	
Newby	1	Coffee County		
New Canaan	1	Cullman County		
New Castle	1	Jefferson County	35119	
New Center	1	Morgan County	35640	
New Convert	1	Chilton County		
New Dora	1	Walker County	35062	
Newell	1	Randolph County	36270	
New Georgia	1	Winston County	35540	
New Harmony	1	Chambers County		
New Harmony	1	Cullman County		
New Haven	1	Madison County	35758	
New Hill	1	Jefferson County	35023	
New Home	1	DeKalb County	35978	
New Hope	1	Coffee County	36346	
New Hope	1	Crenshaw County		
New Hope	1	Cullman County	35083	
New Hope	1	Jackson County	35768	
New Hope	1	Limestone County		
New Hope	1	Madison County	35760	
New Hope	1	Marion County		
New Hope	1	Randolph County		
New Hope	1	Shelby County	35243	
New Hopewell	1	Cleburne County	36264	
New Jagger	1	Walker County		
New Lexington	1	Tuscaloosa County	35546	
New London	1	St. Clair County	35054	
New Market	1	Madison County	35761	
New Moon	1	Cherokee County	35973	
New Mount Hebron	1	Greene County		
New Prospect	1	Autauga County	36056	
New Prospect	1	Hale County	35441	
New Sharon	1	Madison County	35750	
New Site	1	Tallapoosa County	35010	
Newsome	1	DeKalb County	35986	
Newton	1	Dale County	36352	
Newton	1	Houston County		
Newton Springs	1	Houston County	36303	
Newtonville	1	Fayette County	35555	
Newtown	1	Franklin County	35653	
New Town	1	Jackson County	35772	
Newville	1	Henry County	36353	
New West Greene	1	Greene County		
Nichburg	1	Conecuh County	36475	
Nicholsville	1	Marengo County	36784	
Nitrate City	1	Colbert County	35661	
Nix	1	Franklin County		
Nixburg	1	Coosa County	36026	
Nix Mill	1	Franklin County	35581	
Nixon Chapel	1	Marshall County	35980	
Noah	1	Cherokee County	35960	
Nokomis	1	Escambia County	36502	
Nolandale	1	Madison County	35758	
Nolan Hills	1	Madison County		
Norala	1	Colbert County		
Norala Junction	1	Colbert County		
Normal	1	Madison County	35762	
Norman	1	Perry County		
Norrell Junction	1	Jefferson County		
Norris Junction	1	Jefferson County		
North Arab	1	Marshall County	35016	
North Athens	1	Limestone County	35611	
North Auburn	1	Lee County		
North Bibb	1	Bibb County	35188	
North Birmingham	1	Jefferson County	35207	
North Courtland	1	Lawrence County	36518	
North Dadeville	1	Tallapoosa County		
North Daye Hill	1	Madison County		
North Elmore	1	Elmore County	36025	
North Florence	1	Lauderdale County	35630	
North Highlands	1	Jefferson County	35023	
North Johns	1	Jefferson County	35006	
North Lake Park	1	Jefferson County		
North Mobile	1	Mobile County	36611	
Northport	1	Tuscaloosa County	35476	
North Selma	1	Dallas County	36701	
Northside	1	Etowah County		
Northside Acres	1	Madison County		
North Smithfield Estates	1	Jefferson County	35214	
North Talladega	1	Talladega County		
North Vinemont	1	Cullman County	35179	
North Walter	1	Cullman County	35055	
Northwood Hills	1	Lauderdale County	35633	
Norton	1	Etowah County		
Norton	1	Madison County	35808	
Norwood	1	Jefferson County		
Notasulga	2	Lee County	36866	
Notasulga	2	Macon County	36866	
Nottingham	1	Talladega County	35014	
Nuckols	1	Russell County	36856	
Nunnally Ford	1	Shelby County		
Nymph	1	Conecuh County	36401	
Nyota	1	Blount County		

== O ==
Name of place	Number of counties	Principal county	Lower zip code	Upper zip code
Oak	1	Baldwin County		
Oakahalla	1	Walker County		
Oak Bowery	1	Chambers County	36862	
Oakchia	1	Choctaw County		
Oak Crossing	1	Jefferson County	35094	
Oakdale	1	Etowah County		
Oakdale	1	Limestone County	35611	
Oakdale Acres	1	Limestone County		
Oak Grove	1	Autauga County		
Oak Grove	1	Chilton County	35085	
Oak Grove	1	DeKalb County		
Oak Grove	1	Franklin County	35653	
Oak Grove	1	Hale County		
Oak Grove	1	Jefferson County	35006	
Oak Grove	1	Lawrence County		
Oak Grove	1	Limestone County	38449	
Oak Grove	1	Madison County		
Oak Grove	1	Mobile County	36613	
Oak Grove	1	Talladega County	35150	
Oak Grove Estates	1	Jefferson County		
Oak Hill	1	DeKalb County	35962	
Oakhill	1	Wilcox County	36766	
Oak Hill	1	Wilcox County	36766	
Oak Hills	1	Jefferson County		
Oakhurst	1	Jefferson County		
Oakland	1	Chambers County		
Oakland	1	Lauderdale County	35633	
Oakland	1	Limestone County		
Oak Lawn	1	Jefferson County		
Oakleigh Estates	1	Etowah County		
Oaklevel	1	Cleburne County	36262	
Oakley	1	Bibb County		
Oakman	1	Walker County	35579	
Oakmulgee	1	Perry County	36793	
Oak Park	1	Jefferson County	35217	
Oak Park	1	Madison County		
Oak Ridge	1	Morgan County	35640	
Oak Ridge	1	St. Clair County	35125	
Oak Ridge Park	1	Jefferson County		
Oak Village	1	Hale County		
Oakville	1	Jefferson County		
Oakville	1	Lawrence County	35619	
Oakwood	1	Jefferson County	35023	
Oakwood	1	Madison County		
Oakwood College	1	Madison County	35896	
Oakworth	1	Morgan County	35601	
Oaky Grove	1	Henry County	36353	
Oaky Streak	1	Butler County	36063	
Oateston	1	Barbour County		
Ocampo	1	Chilton County		
Oceola	1	Cherokee County		
Octagon	1	Marengo County	36748	
Odena	1	Talladega County	35150	
Oden Ridge	1	Morgan County	35621	
Odenville	1	St. Clair County	35120	
Odom	1	Butler County	36456	
Odom Crossroads	1	Butler County		
Ofelia	1	Randolph County	36266	
Ohatchee	1	Calhoun County	36271	
Ohatchie	1	Calhoun County	36271	
Okatuppa	1	Choctaw County		
Old Bethel	1	Colbert County	35646	
Old Bingham	1	Elmore County		
Old Blevins Mill	1	DeKalb County		
Old Bluffport	1	Sumter County		
Old Burleson	1	Franklin County	35593	
Old Coloma	1	Cherokee County		
Old Davistown	1	Calhoun County	36203	
Old Davisville	1	Calhoun County		
Old Eastaboga	1	Talladega County		
Old Fabius	1	Jackson County		
Oldfield	1	Talladega County	35150	
Old Harmony	1	Etowah County		
Old Jonesboro	1	Jefferson County		
Old Kingston	1	Autauga County	36067	
Old Maylene	1	Shelby County	35114	
Old Monrovia	1	Madison County	35806	
Old Nauvoo	1	Franklin County	35653	
Old Samuel	1	Choctaw County	36908	
Old Spring Hill	1	Marengo County	36742	
Old Texas	1	Monroe County	36768	
Old Town	1	Conecuh County	36401	
Old Town	1	Dallas County	36785	
Oleander	1	Marshall County	35175	
Oliver	1	Lauderdale County	35652	
Ollie	1	Monroe County		
Olmsted	1	Tuscaloosa County	35453	
Olney	1	Pickens County		
Olustee	1	Pike County	36001	
Omaha	1	Randolph County	36274	
Omega	1	Bullock County		
O'Neal	1	Limestone County	35611	
Oneonta	1	Blount County	35121	
Onycha	1	Covington County	36420	
Opelika	1	Lee County	36801	03
Ophir	1	DeKalb County		
Opine	1	Clarke County	36784	
Opine	1	Covington County	36467	
Opp	1	Covington County	36467	
Orange Beach	1	Baldwin County	36561	
Orchard	1	Mobile County		
Ord	1	Etowah County		
Orion	1	Pike County	36081	
Orrville	1	Dallas County	36767	
Orrville	1	Limestone County	35671	
Osaka	1	Escambia County		
Osanippa	1	Chambers County	36872	
Osborn	1	Perry County	36779	
Osco	1	Barbour County		
Oswichee	1	Russell County	36856	
Otho	1	Henry County		
Ottery	1	Calhoun County		
Our Town	1	Tallapoosa County	35010	
Overbrook	1	Talladega County	35150	
Overlook	1	Mobile County	36608	
Overton	1	Jefferson County	35210	
Owassa	1	Conecuh County	36401	
Owens	1	Etowah County		
Owens Cross Roads	1	Madison County	35763	
Owenton	1	Jefferson County		
Oxanna	1	Calhoun County	36203	
Oxford	2	Calhoun County	36203	
Oxford	2	Talladega County	36203	
Oxford Lake	1	Calhoun County	36203	
Ox Level	1	Bullock County		
Oxmoor	1	Jefferson County	35211	
Ozan	1	Shelby County		
Ozark	1	Dale County	36360	

== P ==
Name of place	Number of counties	Principal county	Lower zip code	Upper zip code
Packards Bend	1	Monroe County		
Painter	1	DeKalb County	35962	
Paint Rock	1	Jackson County	35764	
Palestine	1	Cleburne County	36262	
Palmerdale	1	Jefferson County	35123	
Palmers	1	Jefferson County		
Palmers Crossroads	1	Monroe County	36480	
Palmetto	1	Pickens County	35481	
Palmetto Beach	1	Baldwin County	36542	
Palmyra	1	Lowndes County		
Palos	1	Jefferson County	35130	
Panhandle	1	Perry County		
Panola	1	Crenshaw County	36046	
Panola	1	Sumter County	35477	
Pansey	1	Houston County	36370	
Paradise Points	1	Colbert County		
Paradise Shores	1	Lawrence County		
Paragon	1	Choctaw County		
Paramount	1	Shelby County		
Paran	1	Randolph County	36274	
Park City	1	Baldwin County	36526	
Park Courts	1	Jefferson County		
Parkdale	1	Coosa County	35072	
Parker	1	Limestone County		
Parker	1	Sumter County		
Parker Heights	1	Jefferson County		
Parkers Crossroads	1	Lee County		
Parker Springs	1	Escambia County		
Park Hill	1	St. Clair County	35125	
Parkland	1	Walker County	35501	
Park Place	1	Jefferson County		
Parkway Estates	1	Madison County		
Parkwood	1	Jefferson County	35023	
Parnell	1	Chilton County		
Parrish	1	Walker County	35580	
Parsons	1	St. Clair County		
Partridge Crossroads	1	Jefferson County	35180	
Pasqua	1	Shelby County		
Passcut	1	Jefferson County		
Pate	1	Autauga County		
Patsburg	1	Crenshaw County	36049	
Pattersontown	1	Tuscaloosa County		
Patton	1	Walker County	35579	
Patton Chapel	1	Jefferson County	35216	
Patton Junction	1	Walker County		
Paul	1	Conecuh County	36469	
Pauls Hill	1	Jefferson County	35023	
Pawnee	1	Jefferson County	35217	
Pawnee Heights	1	Jefferson County		
Payneville	1	Sumter County		
Peace	1	Autauga County		
Peaceburg	1	Calhoun County		
Peachburg	1	Bullock County		
Peacock	1	Clarke County	36451	
Pearce	1	Houston County		
Pearce's Mills	1	Marion County		
Pea Ridge	1	Escambia County	36426	
Pea Ridge	1	Fayette County	35546	
Pea Ridge	1	Madison County		
Pea Ridge	1	Marion County	35563	
Pea Ridge	1	Shelby County	35113	
Pea Ridge Crossroads	1	DeKalb County		
Pearson	1	Tuscaloosa County	35456	
Peavy	1	Randolph County	36274	
Pebble	1	Winston County	35565	
Pebble Hill	1	Wilcox County		
Peeks Corner	1	DeKalb County	35961	
Peeks Hill	1	Calhoun County	36271	
Peets Corner	1	Limestone County	35611	
Pelham	1	Choctaw County		
Pelham	1	Shelby County	35124	
Pelham Heights	1	Calhoun County	36203	
Pell City	1	St. Clair County	35125	
Pendley	1	Walker County		
Penfield Heights	1	Jefferson County	35217	
Penn	1	Morgan County	35619	
Pennington	1	Choctaw County	36916	
Pennsylvania	1	Mobile County	36525	
Penton	1	Chambers County	36862	
Pentonville	1	Coosa County		
Pepperell	1	Lee County	36801	
Pera	1	Geneva County		
Perdido	1	Baldwin County	36562	
Perdido Beach	1	Baldwin County	36530	
Perdue Hill	1	Monroe County	36470	
Perote	1	Bullock County	36061	
Perrys Mill	1	Montgomery County	36064	
Perry Store	1	Coffee County	36453	
Perryville	1	Perry County	36701	
Perryville	1	Tallapoosa County		
Persimmon Grove	1	Limestone County		
Persimmon Grove	1	Sumter County		
Persons	1	Russell County		
Peterman	1	Houston County		
Peterman	1	Monroe County	36471	
Peterson	1	Tuscaloosa County	35478	
Petersville	1	Lauderdale County	35633	
Petes Crossroads	1	Jefferson County		
Petey	1	Limestone County	35611	
Petrey	1	Crenshaw County	36062	
Petronia	1	Lowndes County	36785	
Pettusville	1	Limestone County	35620	
Peytona Points	1	Colbert County	35661	
Phalin	1	Tuscaloosa County	35456	
Phelan	1	Cullman County	35055	
Phenix City	2	Lee County	36867	
Phenix City	2	Russell County	36867	
Philadelphia	1	Houston County		
Phil Campbell	1	Franklin County	35581	
Phillips Crossroads	1	Shelby County		
Phillips Estates	1	Jefferson County		
Phillipsville	1	Baldwin County	36507	
Phipps	1	Hale County		
Phoenixville	1	Jefferson County		
Pickens Ferry	1	Pickens County		
Pickensville	1	Pickens County	35447	
Pickering	1	Dallas County	36758	
Pickett	1	Bullock County		
Piedmont	2	Calhoun County	36272	
Piedmont	2	Cherokee County	36272	
Piedmont	1	Madison County		
Piedmont Heights	1	Chambers County		
Piedmont Springs	1	Calhoun County	36272	
Pierce	1	Mobile County	36587	
Pigeon Creek	1	Butler County	36037	
Pigeye	1	Marion County		
Pike Road	1	Montgomery County	36064	
Pikeville	1	Jackson County	35768	
Pikeville	1	Marion County		
Pilgrims Rest	1	Etowah County	35901	
Pinchona	1	Baldwin County		
Pinckard	1	Dale County	36371	
Pinder Hill	1	Jackson County	35772	
Pine Apple	1	Wilcox County	36768	
Pine Beach	1	Baldwin County	36542	
Pinebelt	1	Dallas County	36767	
Pine Crest	1	Jefferson County		
Pine Dale	1	Limestone County	38449	
Pinedale	1	Montgomery County	36106	
Pinedale Acres	1	Lauderdale County	35645	
Pinedale Acres	1	Limestone County	35611	
Pinedale Shores	1	St. Clair County	35953	
Pine Flat	1	Autauga County	36022	
Pine Grove	1	Baldwin County		
Pine Grove	1	Bullock County	36053	
Pine Grove	1	Cherokee County	35960	
Pine Grove	1	Lee County		
Pine Grove	1	Mobile County		
Pine Grove	1	Tallapoosa County	36850	
Pine Haven Shores	1	Lauderdale County		
Pine Hill	1	Randolph County	36263	
Pine Hill	1	Wilcox County	36769	
Pine Lake Village	1	Marshall County		
Pine Level	1	Autauga County	36022	
Pine Level	1	Coffee County	36323	
Pine Level	1	Montgomery County	36065	
Pine Mountain	1	Blount County	35133	
Pineola	1	Mobile County		
Pine Orchard	1	Monroe County	36471	
Pine Ridge	1	DeKalb County	35967	
Pine Springs	1	Lamar County		
Pine Tuckey	1	Randolph County		
Pineview	1	Jefferson County	35210	
Pineville	1	Monroe County		
Pinewood Terrace	1	Talladega County	35044	
Piney	1	Cherokee County	35960	
Piney Bend	1	Franklin County	35593	
Piney Chapel	1	Limestone County	35611	
Piney Grove	1	Geneva County		
Piney Grove	1	Lawrence County	35619	
Piney Grove	1	Marion County	35548	
Piney Woods	1	Cleburne County	36262	
Pin Hook	1	Marengo County		
Pinkney City	1	Jefferson County	35214	
Pinkneyville	1	Clay County	35072	
Pinnell	1	Tallapoosa County	36850	
Pinson	1	Jefferson County	35126	
Pinson-Clay-Chalkville	1	Jefferson County		
Pinson Valley	1	Jefferson County		
Pintlala	1	Montgomery County	36043	
Pinto Island	1	Mobile County		
Pioneer	1	Pickens County		
Piper	1	Bibb County		
Pisgah	1	Jackson County	35765	
Pisgah	1	Limestone County	35773	
Pittsview	1	Russell County	36871	
Plainview	1	Cleburne County		
Plainview	1	Dale County		
Plainview	1	DeKalb County	35986	
Plain View	1	Jefferson County	35217	
Plano	1	Cherokee County		
Plant City	1	Chambers County	36863	
Plantersville	1	Dallas County	36758	
Plantersville	1	Talladega County	35014	
Plateau	1	Mobile County	36610	
Pleasant Gap	1	Cherokee County	36272	
Pleasant Grove	1	Chilton County	35085	
Pleasant Grove	1	Franklin County		
Pleasant Grove	1	Jackson County	35772	
Pleasant Grove	1	Jefferson County	35127	
Pleasant Grove	1	Marshall County		
Pleasant Grove	1	Pickens County		
Pleasant Grove	1	St. Clair County		
Pleasant Grove Estates	1	Jefferson County	35466	
Pleasant Groves	1	Jackson County	35776	
Pleasant Hill	1	Barbour County		
Pleasant Hill	1	Choctaw County	36908	
Pleasant Hill	1	Dallas County	36775	
Pleasant Hill	1	DeKalb County		
Pleasant Hill	1	Escambia County	36502	
Pleasant Hill	1	Franklin County	35585	
Pleasant Hill	1	Jackson County		
Pleasant Hill	1	Jefferson County	35023	
Pleasant Hill	1	Macon County		
Pleasant Hill	1	St. Clair County		
Pleasant Hill	1	Winston County		
Pleasant Home	1	Covington County	36420	
Pleasant Plains	1	Houston County		
Pleasant Ridge	1	Franklin County	35653	
Pleasant Ridge	1	Greene County	35462	
Pleasant Ridge	1	Marion County		
Pleasant Ridge	1	Pike County	36034	
Pleasant Site	1	Franklin County	35582	
Pleasant Valley	1	St. Clair County		
Pleasant View	1	Cullman County		
Pletcher	1	Chilton County	36750	
Plevna	1	Madison County	35761	
Poarch	1	Escambia County	36502	
Poarch Community	1	Escambia County		
Poarch Creek Reservation and Trust Lands	2	Elmore County		
Poarch Creek Reservation and Trust Lands	2	Escambia County		
Pocahontas	1	Walker County	35549	
Pogo	1	Franklin County	38827	
Point Clear	1	Baldwin County	36564	
Polk	1	Dallas County	36785	
Pollard	1	Escambia County	36441	
Pollards Bend	1	Cherokee County	35983	
Ponders	1	Tallapoosa County	36853	
Pondville	1	Bibb County	35034	
Pool	1	Lawrence County	35619	
Pooles Crossroad	1	Randolph County	36274	
Pools Crossroads	1	Chilton County	35045	
Pope	1	Cherokee County		
Pope	1	DeKalb County		
Pope	1	Marengo County	36769	
Poplar Creek	1	Lawrence County		
Poplar Creek	1	Limestone County		
Poplar Point	1	Lawrence County		
Poplarridge	1	Madison County	35760	
Poplar Ridge	1	Marshall County		
Poplar Springs	1	Marshall County	35950	
Poplar Springs	1	Winston County	35578	
Poplar Springs Branch	1	Lauderdale County		
Port Birmingham	1	Jefferson County	35118	
Porter	1	Jefferson County	35005	
Portersville	1	DeKalb County	35961	
Porterville	1	DeKalb County		
Portland	1	Dallas County		
Posey Mill	1	Franklin County	35565	
Poseys Crossroads	1	Autauga County	36067	
Poseys Crossroads	1	Chilton County	35971	
Postoak	1	Bullock County	36089	
Potash	1	Randolph County	36274	
Potter	1	Dallas County	36701	
Powderly	1	Jefferson County	35221	
Powderly Hills	1	Jefferson County		
Powell	1	DeKalb County		
Powell's Crossroads	1	DeKalb County	35971	
Powellville	1	Walker County		
Powers	1	Hale County	35474	
Powhatan	1	Jefferson County	35118	
Powledge	1	Lee County	36874	
Praco	1	Jefferson County	35130	
Prairie	1	Wilcox County	36771	
Prairie Bluff	1	Wilcox County		
Prairieville	1	Hale County	36742	
Pratt City	1	Jefferson County	35214	
Prattmont	1	Autauga County	36067	
Pratts	1	Barbour County	36016	
Prattville	2	Autauga County	36067	
Prattville	2	Elmore County	36067	
Prattville Junction	1	Elmore County		
Prescott	1	St. Clair County	35125	
Preston	1	Marshall County	35768	
Prestwick	1	Washington County	36548	
Prices	1	Calhoun County		
Priceville	1	Morgan County	35601	
Prichard	1	Mobile County	36610	
Pride	1	Colbert County	35674	
Primitive Ridge	1	Bibb County	35184	
Prince Crossroads	1	Lee County		
Princeton	1	Jackson County	35766	
Pronto	1	Pike County	36081	
Prospect	1	Walker County	35578	
Providence	1	Butler County	36033	
Providence	1	Cullman County	35179	
Providence	1	Marengo County	36742	
Providence	1	Walker County	35579	
Prudence	1	Russell County	36871	
Pruett	1	Colbert County		
Pruitton	1	Lauderdale County	38463	
Pryor	1	Monroe County		
Pulaski Pike	1	Madison County	35810	
Pulltight	1	Marion County	35548	
Pumpkin Center	1	DeKalb County	35967	
Pumpkin Center	1	Morgan County	35619	
Pumpkin Center	1	Walker County	35130	
Pushmataha	1	Choctaw County	36912	
Putnam	1	Marengo County	36784	
Pyriton	1	Clay County	36266	

== Q ==
Name of place	Number of counties	Principal county	Lower zip code	Upper zip code
Queenstown	1	Jefferson County	35173	
Quicks Mill	1	Madison County		
Quinsey	1	Coosa County		
Quinton	1	Walker County	35130	
Quintown	1	Walker County		

== R ==
Name of place	Number of counties	Principal county	Lower zip code	Upper zip code
Rabb	1	Conecuh County	36401	
Rabbittown	1	Calhoun County	36272	
Rabbit Town	1	Marshall County	35950	
Rabbittown	1	Winston County	35565	
Rabun	1	Baldwin County	36507	
Radford	1	Perry County		
Ragland	1	St. Clair County	35131	
Rahatchie	1	Talladega County	35044	
Raimund	1	Jefferson County	35023	
Rainbow	1	Madison County		
Rainbow City	1	Etowah County	35906	
Rainbow Mountain Heights	1	Madison County		
Rainsville	1	DeKalb County	35986	
Ralph	1	Tuscaloosa County	35480	
Ramah	1	Conecuh County		
Ramer	1	Montgomery County	36069	
Ramsey	1	Etowah County		
Ranburne	1	Cleburne County	36273	
Randolph	1	Bibb County	36792	
Range	1	Conecuh County	36473	
Rash	1	Jackson County	35772	
Rawls	1	Covington County		
Ray	1	Coosa County		
Rayburn	1	Marshall County	35976	
Rays Crossroads	1	Clay County		
Reads Mill	1	Calhoun County	36279	
Ready Crossing	1	Madison County		
Red Apple	1	Marshall County		
Red Bank	1	Lawrence County	35672	
Red Bay	1	Franklin County	35582	
Reddock Springs	1	Butler County	36037	
Red Eagle	1	Bibb County		
Red Gap Junction	1	Jefferson County	35210	
Red Hill	1	Blount County	35063	
Red Hill	1	Elmore County	36078	
Red Hill	1	Marshall County	35976	
Redland Heights	1	Chambers County	36854	
Red Level	1	Chambers County		
Red Level	1	Covington County	36474	
Red Level	1	Montgomery County		
Redmont Park	1	Jefferson County	35223	
Red Ore	1	Jefferson County	35023	
Red Rock	1	Colbert County	35674	
Red Rock Junction	1	Colbert County	35616	
Red Springs	1	Choctaw County		
Red Star	1	Walker County		
Redstone Arsenal	1	Madison County	35809	
Redstone Park	1	Madison County		
Redtown	1	Baldwin County		
Red Wine	1	Jefferson County	35073	
Reece City	1	Etowah County	35954	
Reedtown	1	Franklin County	35653	
Reeltown	1	Tallapoosa County		
Reeses Spur	1	Montgomery County		
Reeseville	1	Etowah County		
Reform	1	Pickens County	35481	
Regency	1	Lauderdale County	35630	
Regent Forest	1	Jefferson County	35216	
Rehobeth	1	Houston County	36302	
Rehoboth	1	Wilcox County	36720	
Reid	1	Limestone County	35611	
Reid Settlement	1	Washington County		
Reilly Field	1	Calhoun County		
Rembert	1	Marengo County		
Remlap	1	Blount County	35133	
Rendalia	1	Talladega County		
Renfroe	1	Talladega County	35160	
Reno	1	Tuscaloosa County	35111	
Renson	1	Monroe County		
Repton	1	Conecuh County	36475	
Republic	1	Jefferson County	35214	
Reynolds	1	Lawrence County		
Reynolds Mill	1	Talladega County		
Rhoades	1	Coffee County	36453	
Rhodes	1	Butler County		
Rhodesville	1	Lauderdale County	35633	
Rice	1	Jefferson County		
Rice	1	Marshall County		
Richards Crossroads	1	Barbour County		
Richardson	1	Cherokee County		
Richburg	1	Coffee County		
Richland	1	Pike County		
Richmond	1	Dallas County	36761	
Richmond Hills	1	Colbert County	35674	
Richville	1	Coosa County		
Rickey	1	Tuscaloosa County		
Riddle	1	Elmore County		
Rideout Village	1	Madison County		
Riderville	1	Chilton County		
Riderwood	1	Choctaw County	36904	
Ridge	1	Greene County		
Ridge Grove	1	Lee County		
Ridgeville	1	Butler County	36030	
Ridgeville	1	Etowah County	35954	
Ridgway Mill	1	Limestone County		
Rigdom	1	Lawrence County		
Riley	1	Monroe County		
Ringgold	1	Cherokee County	35973	
Ripley	1	Limestone County	35611	
Riverbend	1	Bibb County	35184	
River Bend	1	Cullman County		
Riverdale	1	DeKalb County	35984	
River Falls	1	Covington County	36476	
Rivermont	1	Colbert County	35661	
Rivermont	1	Lauderdale County	35633	
River Park	1	Baldwin County	36532	
River Park	1	DeKalb County	35984	
River Ridge	1	Monroe County		
Riverside	1	Blount County	35031	
Riverside	1	Cullman County		
Riverside	1	Etowah County		
Riverside	1	St. Clair County	35135	
Riverton	1	Colbert County	35616	
River View	1	Chambers County	36854	
Riverview	1	Chambers County		
Riverview	1	Escambia County	36426	
Roanoke	1	Randolph County	36274	
Roanoke Junction	1	Lee County	36801	
Roba	1	Macon County	36089	
Robbins	1	Colbert County		
Robbins Crossroads	1	Jefferson County	35139	
Roberson Beach	1	Lauderdale County		
Roberta	1	Shelby County		
Roberts	1	Escambia County	36420	
Roberts Crossroads	1	Dale County		
Robertsdale	1	Baldwin County	36567	
Robertson	1	Lawrence County		
Robinson Crossroads	1	Crenshaw County		
Robinson Crossroads	1	Montgomery County		
Robinsons	1	Lowndes County	36725	
Robinson Springs	1	Elmore County	36025	
Robinsonville	1	Escambia County	36502	
Robinwood	1	Jefferson County	35217	
Robjohn	1	Choctaw County		
Rock Castle	1	Tuscaloosa County		
Rock City	1	Jackson County	35771	
Rock City	1	Marion County	35594	
Rock Creek	1	Colbert County		
Rock Creek	1	Jefferson County		
Rock Creek	1	Winston County		
Rockdale	1	Jefferson County	35023	
Rocket	1	Madison County	35808	
Rock Fence	1	Chambers County		
Rockford	1	Coosa County	35136	
Rock Hill	1	Escambia County	36426	
Rock House	1	Jackson County	35771	
Rockledge	1	Etowah County	35954	
Rock Mills	1	Randolph County	36274	
Rock Run	1	Cherokee County	36272	
Rock Spring	1	Etowah County	35905	
Rock Spring Quarry	1	Etowah County	35905	
Rock Springs	1	Blount County	35031	
Rock Springs	1	Choctaw County	36904	
Rock Springs	1	Clarke County		
Rock Stand	1	Randolph County	36274	
Rockville	1	Clarke County		
Rockwest	1	Wilcox County	36726	
Rockwood	1	Franklin County	35653	
Rocky Ford	1	Greene County		
Rocky Head	1	Dale County	36311	
Rocky Hill	1	Lawrence County	35672	
Rocky Hollow	1	Walker County	35501	
Rocky Mount	1	Chilton County		
Rocky Point	1	Morgan County		
Rocky Ridge	1	Jefferson County	35243	
Rocky Ridge	1	Marshall County		
Rocky Springs	1	Jackson County		
Rodentown	1	DeKalb County	35957	
Rodgers	1	DeKalb County		
Roebuck	1	Jefferson County		
Roebuck	1	Shelby County		
Roebuck Crest Estates	1	Jefferson County		
Roebuck Forest	1	Jefferson County		
Roebuck Gardens	1	Jefferson County		
Roebuck Park	1	Jefferson County		
Roebuck Plaza	1	Jefferson County	35235	
Roebuck Springs	1	Jefferson County		
Roebuck Terrace	1	Jefferson County		
Roeton	1	Coffee County	36010	
Rogers	1	DeKalb County		
Rogers	1	DeKalb County		
Rogersville	1	Lauderdale County	35652	
Rolling Hills	1	Morgan County		
Rollins	1	Chambers County		
Romar Beach	1	Baldwin County	36561	
Rome	1	Covington County	36420	
Romulus	1	Tuscaloosa County	35446	
Ronald	1	Walker County		
Roosevelt	1	Jefferson County	35023	
Roosevelt-Cairo Village (3.446,-86.918)	1	Jefferson County		
Roosevelt City	1	Jefferson County	35023	
Roper	1	Jefferson County	35173	
Rosa	1	Blount County	35121	
Rosalie	1	Jackson County	35765	
Roseboro	1	Madison County	37328	
Rosebud	1	Wilcox County	36766	
Rosedale	1	Jefferson County	35229	
Rosedale	1	Tuscaloosa County	35404	
Rose Hill	1	Covington County	36028	
Rose Hill	1	Jefferson County	35210	
Roselle	1	Clay County		
Rosemary	1	Hale County		
Rosemont	1	Greene County		
Rosemont	1	Jefferson County		
Rose Park	1	Lauderdale County	35633	
Rosinton	1	Baldwin County	36567	
Ross Ford	1	Clay County		
Rossland City	1	Fayette County	35555	
Roundhill	1	Clarke County	36784	
Round Mountain	1	Cherokee County	36879	
Rowells Crossroads	1	Lee County	36879	
Roxana	1	Chambers County		
Roxana	1	Lee County	36879	
Roxana	1	Montgomery County		
Royal	1	Blount County	35031	
Royal City	1	Lee County		
Roy Ford	1	Shelby County		
Ruffner	1	Jefferson County	35210	
Ruffner Number Two	1	Jefferson County		
Rugby Highlands	1	Jefferson County		
Rural	1	Clarke County		
Russell	1	Mobile County	36522	
Russell Cave National Monument	1	Jackson County	35740	
Russell Heights	1	Jefferson County	35094	
Russell Mill	1	Tallapoosa County	35010	
Russell Village	1	Morgan County		
Russellville	1	Franklin County	35653	
Rutan	1	Washington County	36518	
Ruth	1	Marshall County	35016	
Rutherford	1	Russell County	36860	
Ruthven	1	Wilcox County		
Rutledge	1	Crenshaw County	36071	
Rutledge	1	Jefferson County	35228	
Rutledge Heights	1	Jefferson County	35228	
Rutledge Springs	1	Jefferson County		
Rutthven	1	Wilcox County		
Ryan	1	Shelby County	35115	
Ryan Crossroads	1	Morgan County	35087	
Ryland	1	Madison County	35767	
