= Alabama State Route 156 =

State highway in Alabama, United States

State Route 156

Route information
- Maintained by ALDOT
- Length: 7.186 mi (11.565 km)

Major junctions
- West end: SR 17 in Jachin
- East end: SR 114 in Pennington

Location
- Country: United States
- State: Alabama
- Counties: Choctaw

Highway system
- Alabama State Highway System; Interstate; US; State
← SR 155	→ SR 157

State Route 156 (SR 156) is a 7.186-mile (11.565 km) state highway that serves as a connection between Jachin and Pennington in northeastern Choctaw County. SR 156 intersects SR 17 at its western terminus and SR 114 at its eastern terminus.

== Route description ==
SR 156 begins at an intersection with SR 17 in Jachin. Here, the roadway continues as Choctaw County Route 32 (CR 32). The highway travels to the southeast and curves to the east. In Robjohn, it intersects the southern terminus of Choctaw CR 35 (Riverview Circle). SR 156 crosses over Mill Creek and Deas Branch. It travels through Choctaw City and then intersects Choctaw CR 37 (Cove Road). The highway curves to the east-northeast and crosses over Campbell Branch. After a crossing of Threemile Branch, it curves to the east-southeast and enters Pennington. At the southern terminus of Choctaw CR 33, SR 156 turns right and travels due south. It crosses over some railroad tracks of M&B Railroad just before it reaches its eastern terminus, an intersection with SR 114 (Main Street).

== Major intersections ==
The entire route is in Choctaw County.

Location	mi	km	Destinations	Notes
Jachin	0.0	0.0	SR 17 / CR 32 west – Butler, York	Western terminus of SR 156; eastern terminus of CR 32
Pennington	7.186	11.565	SR 114 (Main Street) – Myrtlewood	Eastern terminus
1.000 mi = 1.609 km; 1.000 km = 0.621 mi
