= List of shipwrecks in March 1858 =

The list of shipwrecks in March 1858 includes ships sunk, foundered, wrecked, grounded, or otherwise lost during March 1858.

== 1 March ==
List of shipwrecks: 1 March 1858
Ship	State	Description
Alamode	United Kingdom	The ship was lost in the Turks Islands.
Cortez	United States	The whaler was destroyed by fire at "Cape Crusade". Her crew were rescued.
Eliza Battle	United States	The steamboat was destroyed by fire in the Tombigbee River at Pennington, Alabama when cotton on the stern caught fire, possibly from sparks from the stacks of the passing Warrior (United States). There were around thirty casualties from around 100 people on board.
Gipsey	(United Kingdom of Great Britain and Ireland) Isle of Man	The ship ran aground on The Platters, off Anglesey. She was on a voyage from Poole, Dorset to Liverpool, Lancashire. She was refloated the next day and taken in to Holyhead, Anglesey.
Loyal Standard	United Kingdom	The brig ran aground on the Middle Sand, in the North Sea off the coast of Lincolnshire and sank. Her crew were rescued. She was on a voyage from Newcastle upon Tyne, Northumberland to London. Loya Standard subsequently floated off; she was taken in to Hull, Yorkshire on 3 March in a derelict condition.
Mentor	United Kingdom	The schooner struck the pier at Amble, Northumberland and was wrecked with the loss of all hands. She was on a voyage from Terneuzen, Zeeland, Netherlands to Warkworth, Northumberland.
Nairns	United Kingdom	The brig was wrecked on the Pan Rocks, south of Warkworth, Northumberland with the loss of seven of her nine crew. Two survivors were rescued by Duke of Buccleuch (United Kingdom), which lost three of her crew attempting the rescue.
Percy	United Kingdom	The ship ran aground on the Ridge Sand, in the English Channel off the coast of Nord, France. She was on a voyage from Warkworth, Northumberland to Dieppe, Seine-Inférieure, France. She was refloated and taken in to Folkestone, Kent in a leaky condition, arriving on 2 March.
Perseverance	United Kingdom	The schooner was driven ashore 2 nautical miles (3.7 km) north of Hartlepool, County Durham. Her crew were rescued. She was refloated on 29 March and taken in to Hartlepool.
Poultons	United Kingdom	The schooner was driven ashore at Sunderland, County Durham. Her six crew were rescued by rocket apparatus and bosun's chair. She was on a voyage from Aberdeen to Southampton, Hampshire. She was refloated on 21 March and towed in to Sunderland.
Robert and Mary	United Kingdom	The sloop was driven ashore and wrecked at Staithes, Yorkshire.
Royal Standard	United Kingdom	The ship sank in the North Sea off Grimsby, Lincolnshire. Her crew were rescued.

== 2 March ==
List of shipwrecks: 2 March 1858
Ship	State	Description
Amity	United Kingdom	The brig ran aground off Inchkeith and was damaged. She was on a voyage from South Shields, County Durham to London. She consequently put in to Grangemouth, Stirlingshire.
Elise	France	The ship was taken in to Gibraltar in a derelict condition.
Feronia	United Kingdom	The ship was driven ashore at Dublin. She was refloated.
Louisa	United Kingdom	The schooner struck the pier and sank at Kingstown, County Dublin.
Marie	Denmark	The ship ran aground off Aldeburgh, Suffolk, United Kingdom. Her crew were rescued. She was on a voyage from Løkken to London, United Kingdom.
Northern Empire	Grand Duchy of Oldenburg	The ship was wrecked on the Black Rock, off Falmouth, Cornwall, United Kingdom. Her crew were rescued. She was refloated on 28 May and beached at Falmouth.
Ocean	United Kingdom	The brig ran aground on the Pye Sand, in the North Sea off the coast of Suffolk and sank. Her crew survived. She was on a voyage from Middlesbrough, Yorkshire to Folkestone, Kent.
Strive	United Kingdom	The brig foundered in the North Sea off the Farne Islands, Northumberland with the loss of all seven crew. Wreckage from the ship came ashore at Waren Mill, Northumberland.
William	United Kingdom	The ship struck the Gannet Rock, in the Firth of Forth. She was on a voyage from South Shields, County Durham to London. She consequently put in to Leith, Lothian in a leaky condition.

== 3 March ==
List of shipwrecks: 3 March 1858
Ship	State	Description
Atlas	(United Kingdom of Great Britain and Ireland) British North America	The brigantine was driven ashore between Cork Head and Ringabella, County Cork with the loss of two of her crew. She was on a voyage from Saint John, New Brunswick to Cork.
Ann and Kate	United Kingdom	The schooner was run ashore and wrecked at Wexford. Her crew were rescued.
Enterprise	United Kingdom	The schooner departed from South Shields, County Durham for Leith, Lothian. No further trace, presumed foundered with the loss of all hands.
Joseph Portier	France	The schooner was abandoned in the Atlantic Ocean off Land's End, Cornwall, United Kingdom. Her crew were rescued by the barque Eliza (France). Joseph Portier was on a voyage from Swansea, Glamorgan to Honfleur, Calvados
Liza Brindley	United Kingdom	The schooner ran aground on the Spike Island Bank, off the coast of County Cork. She was on a voyage from the Rio Grande to Liverpool, Lancashire. She had been refloated by 18 March and resumed her voyage.
Margaretha Maria	Netherlands	The ship sprang a leak and foundered off Lisbon, Portugal. Her crew were rescued. She was on a voyage from Newport, Monmouthshire, United Kingdom to Trieste.
Pillau	Prussia	The ship departed from Farsund, Norway for Leith. No further trace, presumed foundered with the loss of all hands.
Robert James Haynes	United Kingdom	The ship was driven ashore near Grimsby, Lincolnshire. She was on a voyage from Kronstadt, Russia to Grimsby. She was refloated on 5 March and taken in to Hull, Yorkshire.
Surinam	United Kingdom	The barque ran aground in the Isles of Scilly. She was on a voyage from Swansea, Glamorgan to London.

== 4 March ==
List of shipwrecks: 4 March 1858
Ship	State	Description
Alexandrina	United Kingdom	The barque was abandoned in the Atlantic Ocean 45 nautical miles (83 km) off the Slyne Head Lighthouse, County Galway. She was on a voyage from South Shields, County Durham to Alexandria, Egypt.
Furness	United Kingdom	The schooner ran aground at Fleetwood, Lancashire.
Marie Mogeuse	Sweden	The schooner was lost off Aldeburgh, Suffolk, United Kingdom. Her crew were rescued. She was on a voyage from a Baltic port to London, United Kingdom.
Olive Branch	United Kingdom	The schooner was driven ashore at Whitehouse, County Antrim.
Orwell	United Kingdom	The sloop was wrecked on the Newcombe Sand, in the North Sea off the coast of Suffolk. Her five crew were rescued by the Lowestoft Lifeboat. She was on a voyage from Arbroath, Forfarshire to London.
Parrsbro'	United Kingdom	The brig was driven ashore at Massarun Point, County Antrim.
Widow	United Kingdom	The schooner was driven ashore at Massarun Point.

== 5 March ==
List of shipwrecks: 5 March 1858
Ship	State	Description
Ann Cook	United Kingdom	The ship was damaged by fire at Troon, Ayrshire.
Anne	United Kingdom	The ship ran aground on the Blackwater Bank, in the Irish Sea. She was refloated and taken in to Waterford in a sinking condition.
Dolphin	United Kingdom	The fishing boat ran aground on the Horse Bank, in the Irish Sea off the coast of Lancashire and was abandoned. She subsequently floated off and was driven ashore near Southport, Lancashire, where she was severely damaged.
Emma	United Kingdom	The Mersey Flat foundered at the mouth of the River Dee.
Excel	United Kingdom	The smack was beached at Porthdinllaen, Caernarfonshire. She was on a voyage from Bangor to Chepstow, Monmouthshire.
Foyle	United Kingdom	The schooner was driven ashore at Troon.
Furness Miner	United Kingdom	The ship was driven ashore at Fleetwood, Lancashire. She was on a voyage from Glasgow, Renfrewshire to Fleetwood. She was refloated.
Jonah	United Kingdom	The schooner was driven ashore and damaged at Lytham St Annes, Lancashire. Her crew survived.
Liberato Terceiro	Brazil	The schooner was driven ashore and wrecked at Funchal, Madeira. Her crew were rescued.
Margaret	United Kingdom	The ship was driven ashore at Ayr. She was on a voyage from Belfast, County Antrim to Ayr.
Marquis of Camden	United Kingdom	The brig foundered in the North Sea off Flamborough Head, Yorkshire. Her crew were rescued by the brig Broderick (United Kingdom). Marquis of Camden was on a voyage from Sunderland, County Durham to Rochester, Kent.
Reliance	United Kingdom	The brig was driven ashore and wrecked at Funchal with the loss of six lives.
Wild Wave	United States	The medium clipper was wrecked on Oeno Island (24°01′S 130°53′W), 75 nautical miles (139 km) north west of Pitcairn Island. Her 38 crew survived. Seven crew sailed to Pitcairn Island, where the built a boat named John Adams. Four of them subsequently sailed for Tahiti, but landed on Nuku Hiva, in the Marquesas Islands. They were rescued by USS Vandalia (United States Navy), which subsequently rescued the rest of the survivors. Wild Wave was on a voyage from San Francisco, California to Valparaíso, Chile.
Williams	United Kingdom	The brig foundered in the North Sea off Flamborough Head. Her crew were rescued by the steamship Hunwick (United Kingdom). Williams was on a voyage from Sunderland to Rouen, Seine-Inférieure, France.

== 6 March ==
List of shipwrecks: 6 March 1858
Ship	State	Description
Amsterdam Packet	United Kingdom	The ship was driven ashore by ice and wrecked at Hellevoetsluis, Zeeland.
Beejapore	United Kingdom	The ship was driven onto the Pluckington Bank, in the Irish Sea off the coast of Lancashire. She was on a voyage from Callao, Peru to Liverpool, Lancashire.
Duchess of Kent	United Kingdom	The schooner foundered off Guernsey, Channel Islands. Her crew were rescued by Admiral Windham (United Kingdom). Duchess of Kent was on a voyage from Saint Sampson, Guernsey to London and/or Ipswich, Suffolk.
Independant	France	The brigantine was lost at the mouth of the Guadalquivir. Her crew were rescued. She was on a voyage from Newcastle upon Tyne, Northumberland, United Kingdom to Seville, Spain.
Jonah	United Kingdom	The ship was driven ashore in the River Ribble and sank. She was on a voyage from Dundalk, County Louth to Preston, Lancashire.
Oultan, or Outlaw	United Kingdom	The ship was destroyed by fire at Holyhead, Anglesey. She was on a voyage from the River Dee to Dublin.
Premium	United Kingdom	The brig ran aground on the Barbaer Sand, in the North Sea off the coast of Norfolk. She was refloated.
Stag	United Kingdom	The brig collided with another brig and sank off Covehithe, Suffolk. Her crew were rescued by a yawl. She was on a voyage from South Shields, County Durham to London.

== 7 March ==
List of shipwrecks: 7 March 1858
Ship	State	Description
Admiral Moorsom	United Kingdom	The ship was wrecked on the Flemish Banks, in the North Sea. Her crew were rescued. She was on a voyage from Hull, Yorkshire to Odesa.
Adventure	United Kingdom	The ship ran aground "on the Dogger Bank". She was on a voyage from Wexford to Dublin. She had become a wreck by 17 March.
Governor Ready	United Kingdom	The smack was wrecked on St Mary's Isle, Douglas, Isle of Man with the loss of her captain.
Marius	United Kingdom	The schooner ran aground at Holyhead, Anglesey, United Kingdom. She was on a voyage from Plymouth, Devon to Liverpool, Lancashire.
Noel Raphael	France	The ship ran aground near Honfleur, Calvados. She was on a voyage from Liverpool to Honfleur. She sank on 11 March.
San Francisco	Kingdom of the Two Sicilies	The barque was driven ashore east of Gibraltar. She was on a voyage from Naples to Hull. She was consequently condemned.
Stanley	United Kingdom	The ship was wrecked on Great Isaac Cay, Bahamas.
Tarsa	United Kingdom	The brigantine was in collision with the steamship Ironmaster (United Kingdom) and sank in the North Sea off the Dudgeon Lightship ( Trinity House). Her crew were rescued by Ironmaster. Tarsa was on a voyage from Hull, Yorkshire to Montevideo, Uruguay.

== 8 March ==
List of shipwrecks: 8 March 1858
Ship	State	Description
Catherine	United Kingdom	The ship struck the pier at Bridlington, Yorkshire and sank. She was on a voyage from Inverness to Sunderland, County Durham.
Friends	United Kingdom	The sloop was wrecked near Saltfleet, Lincolnshire. She was on a voyage from Goole, Yorkshire to London.
Friendship	United Kingdom	The brig ran aground on the Newcombe Sand, in the North Sea off the coast of Suffolk. She was refloated and taken in to Lowestoft, Suffolk in a leaky condition.
Hilda	United Kingdom	The ship was driven ashore at Grainthorpe, Lincolnshire. She was on a voyage from Kingston upon Hull, Yorkshire to South Shields, County Durham. She was refloated on 15 March, but capsized and sank the next day.
James Holmes	(United Kingdom of Great Britain and Ireland) Isle of Man	The sloop was abandoned off the coast of Denbighshire. She was subsequently boarded by three fishermen but capsized and broke in two. The fishermen were rescued by the Rhyl Lifeboat. James Holmes was on a voyage from an Irish port to Douglas, Isle of Man.
Jane	United Kingdom	The ship was driven ashore at Mundesley, Norfolk with the loss of all five crew. She was on a voyage from King's Lynn, Norfolk to Southampton, Hampshire.
Quicksilver	United Kingdom	The collier collided with the brig Jane (United Kingdom) and foundered in the North Sea off Happisburgh. Her crew were rescued by Jane. Quicksilver was on a voyage from Sunderland, County Durham to London.
Wave	United Kingdom	The ship ran aground off Mazagan, Morocco. She was on a voyage from Liverpool, Lancashire to Safi, Morocco. She was consequently beached near Saffi.
William and Ann	United Kingdom	The barque was abandoned off Madeira. Her crew were rescued by Catherine (United Kingdom). William and Ann was on a voyage from Newport, Monmouthshire to Madeira.

== 9 March ==
List of shipwrecks: 9 March 1858
Ship	State	Description
Adler, and Simpson	Bremen; United Kingdom	The steamship Adler was driven ashore by ice at Bremen. The steamship Simpson went to her assistance, but was also driven ashore. Adler was on a voyage from London, United Kingdom to Bremen.
Degrace	United Kingdom	The ship capsized off Gonaïves, Haiti with the loss of eleven lives.
Fidelity	United Kingdom	The brig sprang a leak and foundered in the North Sea 18 nautical miles (33 km) off Lowestoft, Suffolk. Her crew were rescued by the smack Adventure (United Kingdom). Fidelity was on a voyage from Thurso, Caithness to Middlesbrough, Yorkshire.
Jacobine	Denmark	The ship was driven ashore on the west coast of North Uist, Outer Hebrides, United Kingdom. She was on a voyage from Thisted to an Irish port. She was refloated the next day and taken in to harbor for repairs.
Solide	France	The brig was driven ashore at Calais. She was on a voyage from Dieppe, Seine-Inférieure to Sunderland, County Durham, United Kingdom. She was consequently condemned, but was refloated on 20 March and taken in to Calais.
Thorwaldsen	Norway	The barque was driven ashore and wrecked at Strathy, Sutherland, United Kingdom with the loss of nine of the fifteen people on board. She was on a voyage from Cardiff, Glamorgan to Trondheim.

== 10 March ==
List of shipwrecks: 10 March 1858
Ship	State	Description
Alice Wilson	United Kingdom	The ship was severely damaged by fire at Birkenhead, Cheshire.
Fortitude	United Kingdom	The barque struck the Gunn Rock. She was on a voyage from a port in Peru to Aberdeen. She was taken in to Donegal in a leaky condition.
Hellevina Americina	Netherlands	The galiot ran aground on the Namagrah Shoal, in the Dardaneles. She was on a voyage from Newcastle upon Tyne, Northumberland, United Kingdom to Galaţi, Ottoman Empire.
Hope	United Kingdom	The ketch sprang a leak and sank in the English Channel off New Romney, Kent. Her crew were rescued.
Lady Bannerman	United Kingdom	The brig sank in the English Channel 40 nautical miles (74 km) off Hastings, Sussex. Her crew were rescued.
Minor	United Kingdom	The brig foundered in the North Sea 7 nautical miles (13 km) off Ostend, West Flanders, Belgium. Her crew were rescued by Wynaud (United Kingdom). Minor was on a voyage from Sunderland, County Durham to Ostend.
Pictou	United Kingdom	The schooner was driven ashore at the Third Cliff, Massachusetts, United States. Her crew were rescued. She was on a voyage from Boston, Massachusetts to New York, United States. She was declared a total loss.

== 11 March ==
List of shipwrecks: 11 March 1858
Ship	State	Description
Judith	United Kingdom	The barque ran aground on the Tongue Sand, off the coast of Kent. She was on a voyage from Cardiff, Glamorgan to London. She was refloated with assistance from the tugs Express and Rob Roy (both United Kingdom).

== 12 March ==
List of shipwrecks: 12 March 1858
Ship	State	Description
Balmoral	United Kingdom	The ship ran aground on the Insand, in the North Sea off the coast of County Durham. She was refloated on 14 March.
Drummond	United Kingdom	The ship struck the Whitby Rock and sank. Her crew were rescued. She was on a voyage from Sunderland, County Durham to London.
Dawn	United Kingdom	The ship ran aground on the Middle Ground, in the River Tyne.
Eddystone	United States	The clipper ran aground on the Herd Sand, in the North Sea off the coast of County Durham. She was refloated and taken in to South Shields, County Durham.
Felicitas	Stettin	The ship was driven ashore at Egmond aan Zee, North Holland, Netherlands. She was on a voyage from London to Stettin. She was refloated on 2 April and taken in to Texel, North Holland.
Henry	United Kingdom	The ship ran aground on the Middle Ground.
Hercules	United Kingdom	The ship ran aground at the mouth of the River Tyne. She was refloated and resumed her voyage.
Jane and Esther	United Kingdom	The ship was driven ashore and wrecked 5 nautical miles (9.3 km) west of St Alban's Head, Dorset. Her crew were rescued. She was on a voyage from London to Constantinople, Ottoman Empire.
Peggy	United Kingdom	The ship ran aground on the Gunfleet Sand, in the North Sea off the coast of Essex. She was on a voyage from London to Bridlington, Yorkshire. She was refloated and taken in to Harwich, Essex in a leaky condition.
Robert and Joseph	United Kingdom	The brig ran aground on the Insand. She was run into by four vessels and sank.
Sylvan	United Kingdom	The barque ran aground on the Insand. She was refloated on 14 March.
Tecla y Carmen	Spain	The ship was driven ashore and wrecked at Aberystwyth, Cardiganshire, United Kingdom. She was on a voyage from Bristol, Gloucestershire, to Liverpool, Lancashire, United Kingdom.

== 13 March ==
List of shipwrecks: 13 March 1858
Ship	State	Description
Alderman	United Kingdom	The ship was severely damaged at South Shields, County Durham.
Anna Maria	France	The brig was driven ashore 5 nautical miles (9.3 km) south of Lytham St. Annes, Lancashire, United Kingdom.
Aureo	Austrian Empire	The brig ran aground on the Varne Sand. She was on a voyage from South Shields to Constantinople, Ottoman Empire. Aureo was refloated and beached east of Dover, Kent, United Kingdom. She was subsequently refloated and towed in to Dover in a severely damaged condition.
Bloomer	United Kingdom	The schooner ran aground on the King's Scar, in the Irish Sea. She was on a voyage from Lancaster, Lancashire to Belfast, County Antrim. She was refloated at taken in to Fleetwood, Lancashire in a leaky condition.
Charles	United Kingdom	The ship was wrecked on Lundy Island, Devon with the loss of five of her crew. She was on a voyage from Plymouth, Devon to a Welsh port.
Dawn	United Kingdom	The ship ran aground on the Middle Ground, in the North Sea off the coast of County Durham.
Defence	United Kingdom	The ship was wrecked near Boscastle, Cornwall. Her crew were rescued. She was on a voyage from Corisco, Spanish Guinea to Liverpool, Lancashire.
Earsdon	United Kingdom	The steamship ran aground on the Insand, in the North Sea off the coast of County Durham. She was refloated.
Eddystone	United States	The ship ran aground on the Herd Sand, in the North Sea off the coast of County Durham.
Elizabeth	United Kingdom	The Blyth-registered ship was severely damaged at South Shields.
Elizabeth	United Kingdom	The South Shields-registered ship was severely damaged at South Shields.
Esperance	France	The ship was wrecked on Cooper's Sands, off the coast of Glamorgan, United Kingdom. She was on a voyage from Rouen, Seine-Inférieure to Newport, Monmouthshire, United Kingdom.
Henrietta	United Kingdom	The brig ran aground on the Middle Ground.
Hope	United Kingdom	The ship was driven ashore and severely damaged at Bootle, Lancashire. She was on a voyage from Dublin to Annan, Dumfriesshire.
Lowestoft	United Kingdom	The ship was severely damaged. She put back to South Shields.
Navigator	United Kingdom	The ship was severely damaged. She put back to South Shields.
St. Nicholas	Greece	The ship was driven ashore and wrecked at Spiddal, County Galway, United Kingdom.
Sylvan	United Kingdom	The ship ran aground on the Insand and was damaged. She was on a voyage from South Shields to Marseille, Bouches-du-Rhône, France. She was refloated the next day.

== 14 March ==
List of shipwrecks: 14 March 1858
Ship	State	Description
Ann Maria	France	The ship was driven ashore south of Lytham St. Annes, Lancashire, United Kingdom. She was on a voyage from Nantes, Loire-Inférieure to Preston, Lancashire.
Billow	United Kingdom	The ship was damaged by fire at Liverpool, Lancashire with the loss of a crew member.
Clipper	United Kingdom	The brig sank at Dungeness, Kent. Her crew were rescued. She was on a voyage from London to Newport, Monmouthshire. She was refloated on 28 March and taken in to Dover, Kent in a derelict condition. Her captain was subsequently charged with barratry. He was convicted and sentenced to 8 years penal servitude.
Janet Wilson	United Kingdom	The ship was driven ashore near Parenzo, Austrian Empire and broke her back. She was on a voyage from Trieste to Falmouth, Cornwall. She was consequently condemned.

== 15 March ==
List of shipwrecks: 15 March 1858
Ship	State	Description
HMS Cumberland	Royal Navy	The third rate ship of the line ran aground on an uncharted rock off the Isla de Flores, Uruguay.
Diamond	United Kingdom	The ship was wrecked on the Whitby Rock. Her crew were rescued by a coble. She was on a voyage from South Shields, County Durham to London.
Ultonia	United Kingdom	The ship sighted in the South Atlantic whilst on a voyage from London to Melbourne, Victoria. No further trace, presumed foundered with the loss of all 183 people on board.

== 16 March ==
List of shipwrecks: 16 March 1858
Ship	State	Description
Dromo	United Kingdom	The ship struck a submerged object and sank at Seaham, County Durham. She was on a voyage from London to Seaham.
Escape	United Kingdom	The brig was wrecked 15 nautical miles (28 km) east of "Djygelle", Algeria with the loss of three of her nine crew.
Henrietta	United Kingdom	The schooner ran aground at Rhyl, Denbighshire. She was on a voyage from Newport, Monmouthshire to the Voryd River.
Kingston	United Kingdom	The ship struck the Hohman Rock and was damaged. She was on a voyage from South Shields, County Durham to New York. She put in to the Isles of Scilly.
Titan	United States	The ship was abandoned in the South Atlantic. Her crew took to a boat. They were rescued on 20 March by Golconde (France). Titan was on a voyage from the Chincha Islands, Peru to an English port.

== 17 March ==
List of shipwrecks: 17 March 1858
Ship	State	Description
Australia	United Kingdom	The ship was driven ashore at Hellevoetsluis, Zeeland, Netherlands.
Edendale	United Kingdom	The full-rigged ship ran aground on the Hendon Rock, on the coast of County Durham and was severely damaged. She was on a voyage from Sunderland, County Durham to Calcutta, India. She was refloated and put back to Sunderland.
Lord Althorpe	United Kingdom	The ship ran aground on the Knobben, in the Kattegat off Anholt, Denmark. She floated off and sank. Her crew were rescued by Anna Dorothea ( Danzig). Lord Althorpe was on a voyage from Newcastle upon Tyne, Northumberland to Swinemünde, Prussia.
Plynlymmon	United Kingdom	The steamship ran aground on the Swash. She was on a voyage from Bristol, Gloucestershire to Liverpool, Lancashire. She was refloated and resumed her voyage.

== 18 March ==
List of shipwrecks: 18 March 1858
Ship	State	Description
Challenger	United Kingdom	The ship exploded and sank off Thisted, Denmark. Her crew survived. She was on a voyage from South Shields, County Durham to Swinemünde, Prussia.
Eva	United Kingdom	The schooner was run into by the galiot Juffer Essemensinga (Netherlands) and sank off Orfordness, Suffolk. Her crew were rescued by Juffer Essemensinga. Eva was on a voyage from South Shields, County Durham to Paramaribo, Brazil.
Killarney	United Kingdom	The steamship ran aground and was damaged in the River Gannel. She was refloated and departed the next day for Newport, Monmouthshire for repaies.
Maria	(United Kingdom of Great Britain and Ireland) Tasmania	The ship was wrecked in Louisa Bay. Her crew were rescued. She was on a voyage from Peppermint Bay to Sydney, New South Wales.

== 19 March ==
List of shipwrecks: 19 March 1858
Ship	State	Description
Circassian	United Kingdom	The ship ran aground on the Swinebottoms, in the Baltic Sea. She was on a voyage from South Shields, County Durham to Swinemünde, Prussia. She was refloated and take in to Helsingør, Denmark for repairs.

== 20 March ==
List of shipwrecks: 20 March 1858
Ship	State	Description
Eagle	United Kingdom	The steamship was driven ashore Bootle Bay. She was on a voyage from Dublin to Liverpool, Lancashire.
Heatherbell	United Kingdom	The ship was abandoned in the Black Sea 10 wersts (5.76 nautical miles (10.67 km)) off "Schabelsky", Russia. She subsequently capsized and drifted out to sea.
Sir William Wallace	United Kingdom	The ship was wrecked on Moriarty's Reef, off Passage Island, Tasmania. Her crew were rescued.

== 21 March ==
List of shipwrecks: 21 March 1858
Ship	State	Description
Antonia	Austrian Empire	The brig was driven ashore in Broadhaven Bay. She was refloated.
Palmetto	United States	During a voyage from Philadelphia, Pennsylvania, to Boston, Massachusetts, carrying general cargo, the 186-foot (57 m), 750-gross register ton schooner-rigged screw steamer ran aground in fog near Black Rock on the south point of Block Island off the coast of Rhode Island. She was refloated but consequently sank nearby just offshore in 40 feet (12 m) of water at 41°08.434′N 071°35.696′W. All on board were rescued.
Vigilant	United Kingdom	The ship was wrecked at Helsingør, Denmark.

== 22 March ==
List of shipwrecks: 22 March 1858
Ship	State	Description
Amelia	United Kingdom	The schooner was driven ashore at Missolonghi, Greece. She was on a voyage from Patras, Greece to London. She was refloated and resumed her voyage.
Henry Ellis	United Kingdom	The ship ran aground at Calcutta, India. She was on a voyage from Calcutta to the Cape of Good Hope, Cape Colony. She was refloated and resumed her voyage.

== 23 March ==
List of shipwrecks: 23 March 1858
Ship	State	Description
Orion	Norway	The full-rigged ship was driven ashore and wrecked at Steenberg, Denmark. Her crew were rescued.
Undaunted	United Kingdom	The steamship ran aground in the Hooghly River. She was refloated and resumed her voyage.

== 24 March ==
List of shipwrecks: 24 March 1858
Ship	State	Description
Darling	United Kingdom	The ship was wrecked at Terceira Island, Azores.
Kong Hakon	Norway	The full-rigged ship was holed by ice and sank in the Black Sea off Yeysk, Russia. Her crew survived She subsequently came ashore there before 11 April.
Nicholas I	United Kingdom	The steamship ran aground on the North Bank, in Liverpool Bay. She was on a voyage from Runcorn, Cheshire to Dublin. She was refloated and resumed her voyage.
Richard and Alice	United Kingdom	The brig was driven ashore at Seaview, Isle of Wight. She was on a voyage from Swansea, Glamorgan to London.

== 25 March ==
List of shipwrecks: 25 March 1858
Ship	State	Description
Actress	United Kingdom	The ship ran aground on the Ossibaw Shoals off the coast of Georgia and was wrecked. Her crew were rescued. She was on a voyage from the Clyde to Savannah, Georgia, United States.
Effort	United Kingdom	The brig was wrecked near Langeoog, Kingdom of Hanover. Her crew were rescued. She was on a voyage from Sunderland, County Durham to Hamburg.
Enterprise	United Kingdom	The ship ran aground on the Goodwin Sands, Kent. She was on a voyage from Dunkirk, Nord, France to Liverpool, Lancashire. She was refloated and resumed her voyage.
Grange	United Kingdom	The ship was driven ashore and wrecked in Apollo Bay. She was on a voyage from Melbourne, Victoria to Guam.

== 26 March ==
List of shipwrecks: 26 March 1858
Ship	State	Description
Chanticleer	United Kingdom	The ship ran aground in the Swine. She was on a voyage from Newcastle upon Tyne, Northumberland to Stettin. She was refloated on 28 March and completed her voyage.
Lord Nelson	United Kingdom	The ship foundered in the Atlantic Ocean off Trevose Head, Cornwall. Her crew were rescued. She was on a voyage from Neath, Glamorgan to Teignmouth, Devon.

== 27 March ==
List of shipwrecks: 27 March 1858
Ship	State	Description
Eliza Cornish	United Kingdom	The ship ran aground at Sunderland, County Durham. She was refloated and put back to Sunderland in a leaky condition.
Exchange	United Kingdom	The ship was wrecked on the Boskinn Reef, in the North Sea off Groningen, Netherlands. Her crew were rescued. She was on a voyage from Sunderland, County Durham to Hamburg.
Johanna	Stettin	The schooner capsized and sank at South Shields, County Durham.
Matilda	United Kingdom	The ship ran aground and sank off Maranhão, Empire of Brazil. Her crew were rescued.
Sarah Judkins	United States	The ship was destroyed by fire in Apalachicola Bay.

== 28 March ==
List of shipwrecks: 28 March 1858
Ship	State	Description
Albion	United Kingdom	The schooner was run into and sunk off the Mull of Galloway, Wigtownshire by the steamship Tubal Cain (United Kingdom) with the loss of a crew member. Albion was on a voyage from Maryport, Cumberland to Belfast, County Antrim.
Egida	Trieste	The ship was run aground on the Arklow Bank, in the Irish Sea off the coast of County Wicklow, United Kingdom. She was on a voyage from Liverpool, Lancashire, United Kingdom to Trieste. She was refloated and taken in to Dublin, United Kingdom.
L'Urgent	France	The brig sprang a leak and foundered off Faro, Portugal. Her crew survived. She was on a voyage from Gibraltar to A Coruña, Spain.
Père Etienne	France	The ship ran aground on the Sunk Sand, in the North Sea off the coast of Essex, United Kingdom. She was on a voyage from Nantes, Loire-Inférieure to Colchester, Essex. She was refloated and assisted in to Harwich, Essex.

== 29 March ==
List of shipwrecks: 29 March 1858
Ship	State	Description
Egioda	Austrian Empire	The barque ran aground on the Glasgorman Bank, in the Irish Sea. She was on a voyage from Liverpool, Lancashire, United Kingdom to Trieste. She was refloated with the assistance of the Coast Guard and taken in to Kingstown, County Dublin, United Kingdom in a severely leaky condition.

== 30 March ==
List of shipwrecks: 30 March 1858
Ship	State	Description
Active	United Kingdom	The brig ran aground on the Goodwin Sands, Kent. She was refloated and resumed her voyage.
Hero	United Kingdom	The ship was driven ashore and wrecked at St. Bees, Cumberland. Her crew were rescued. She was on a voyage from Belfast, County Antrim to Maryport, Cumberland.
Maria Janet	United Kingdom	The ship ran aground near Seacombe, Cheshire. She was on a voyage from Pernambuco, Brazil to Liverpool, Lancashire.
Matilda	United Kingdom	The ship was wrecked on the coast of Brazil.

== 31 March ==
List of shipwrecks: 31 March 1858
Ship	State	Description
Dos Hijos	Spain	The schooner was wrecked at Portevedra with the loss of seventeen lives.
Duchess of Northumberland	United Kingdom	The ship departed from Akyab, Burma for Falmouth, Cornwall. No further trace, presumed foundered with the loss of all hands.
Jeanette	United Kingdom	The schooner collided with the steamship Swallow (United Kingdom) and sank off the mouth of the Elbe. Her crew were rescued by Swallow. Jeanette was on a voyage from Hull, Yorkshire to Tønning, Duchy of Holstein.
Juliet	United Kingdom	The ship ran aground in the Solway Firth. She was on a voyage from London to Glasgow, Renfrewshire.
Œtos	United Kingdom	The ship struck the Goose Rock, off the Isle of Wight and was damaged. She was on a voyage from Callao, Peru to Cowes, Isle of Wight.
Sutlej	United Kingdom	The ship ran aground and sank in the River Tay. Her 27 crew were rescued by a pilot cutter. She was on a voyage from Dundee, Forfarshire to Melbourne, Victoria.

== Unknown date ==
List of shipwrecks: Unknown date in March 1858
Ship	State	Description
Admiral Zoutmann	Netherlands	The full-rigged ship was wrecked on the coast of Florida, United States before 29 March. Her crew were rescued. She was on a voyage from Havana, Cuba to Queenstown, County Cork, United Kingdom.
Africano	Greece	The ship foundered in the Mediterranean Sea off the coast of Algeria before 5 March with the loss of five of her ten crew. She was on a voyage from Swansea, Glamorgan, United Kingdom to Smyrna, Ottoman Empire.
Anna Catharina	United Kingdom	The ship foundered in the North Sea off the coast of Lincolnshire, United Kingdom on or before 3 March.
Anne	United Kingdom	The ship was presumed to have foundered before 16 March. She was on a voyage from Milford Haven to Fishguard, Pembrokeshire.
Argo	United Kingdom	The brig was abandoned in the Atlantic Ocean before 17 March.
Argonautes	France	The steamship was lost at Île Sainte-Marie, Madagascar before 27 March.
Blanche	France	The schooner foundered off Tahiti between 13 and 20 March with the loss of all five people on board. She was on a voyage from Tahiti to San Francisco, California, United States.
Bogota	Republic of New Granada	The steamship struck a submerged object and sank in the Magdalena River before 31 March.
Catherine	United Kingdom	The brig was wrecked off "Egmont" with the loss of all hands. She was on a voyage from Sunderland, County Durham to Dieppe, Seine-Inférieure.
Colos	Greece	The ship was wrecked near Mykonos before 9 March.
Egyptus	France	The steamship was wrecked at Kerasund, Ottoman Empire. All on board were rescued. She was on a voyage from Trebizond to Constantinople, Ottoman Empire.
Ellen	United Kingdom	The barque was damaged by an explosion in her cargo of coal at Swansea, Glamorgan.
Empire State	United States	The steamship struck rocks at "Matinacook Point" and sank. All on board were rescued.
Flora Kerr	United Kingdom	The ship caught fire and was abandoned. Her crew were rescued by War Cloud (United Kingdom). Flora Kerr was on a voyage from Demerara, British Guiana to London.
Gorinchem	Netherlands	The ship was wrecked on the coast of Borneo, Netherlands East Indies. Her crew were rescued.
Harriet	United Kingdom	The brig was driven ashore between Happisburgh and Winterton-on-Sea, Norfolk between 6 and 8 March. Her crew were rescued. She was on a voyage from Danzig to London. She was refloated and towed in to Great Yarmouth, Norfolk by a smack.
Hebrides	United Kingdom	The ship was driven ashore near Portland Bill, Dorset. She was refloated and taken in to Southampton, Hampshire in a leaky conditio.
Industrie	France	The schooner was wrecked on the Goodwin Sands, Kent, United Kingdom. Her crew were rescued. She was on a voyage from Rouen, Seine-Inférieure to London, United Kingdom.
Iris	United Kingdom	The ship ran aground on the Holyhead Bank, in the Irish Sea. She was refloated on 4 March and towed in to Belfast, County Antrim.
Kertch	United Kingdom	The barque foundered off Cape St. Vincent, Portugal. Her crew were rescued. She was on a voyage from Leith, Lothian to Cádiz Spain.
Lacon	United Kingdom	The ship was wrecked near Athens, Greece. She was on a voyage from Odesa to Falmouth, Cornwall or Queenstown, County Cork.
Manchester	United Kingdom	The ship was driven ashore at Skerries, County Dublin. She was on a voyage from Liverpool to Llanelly, Glamorgan.
Maria Jewett	United Kingdom	The ship ran aground in the River Mersey near Seacombe, Cheshire. She was on a voyage from the Rio Grande to Liverpool. She was refloated on 30 March.
Mio Figlio	Flag unknown	The ship was driven ashore on Paxos, United States of the Ionian Islands. She was on a voyage from Samsoun, Ottoman Empire to Hull, Yorkshire, United Kingdom. She was refloated and taken in to Castel Nuovo, Kingdom of the Two Sicilies for repairs.
Oak	United Kingdom	The Mersey Flat ran aground on the West Hoyle Bank, in Liverpool Bay and was abandoned by her crew. She was refloated.
Omonia Argiri	Greece	The ship was wrecked near Psara before 9 March.
Orion	Norway	The ship was wrecked at Steinberg, Duchy of Holstein. Her crew were rescued.
Penelope	United Kingdom	The smack was abandoned in the North Sea before 19 March.
R. H. Gamble	United States	The barque was driven ashore in the Dry Tortugas before 6 March. She was on a voyage from New York to St. Marks, Florida. She was refloated and resumed her voyage.
Sierra Nevada	United States	The ship ran aground on Crocker's Reef, off Savannah, Georgia. She was on a voyage from Havana, Cuba to Marseille, Bouches-du-Rhône, France.
Sofia	Greece	The ship was wrecked near Mykonos before 9 March.
Statesman	United Kingdom	The ship was driven ashore at Fleetwood, Lancashire. She was refloated.
St. Jago	United Kingdom	The brig was abandoned in the Atlantic Ocean before 27 March.
Victress	United Kingdom	The ship was lost in the Bahamas.
