= Jachin =

Jachin may refer to:

- Jachin (biblical figure), a minor biblical figure
- The right pillar on the porch of Solomon's Temple named after Jachin; see Boaz and Jachin
- Jachin, Alabama, an unincorporated community in Alabama, United States
