= 1920 Alabama coal strike =

Strike of United Mine Workers

Alabama coal strike
- Date: September 7, 1920 – February 1921
- Location: Walker County, Alabama
- Goals: Union organizing
- Methods: Strikes, Protest, Demonstrations
- Result: Defeat for the union

Parties
United Mine Workers of America	Alabama State Militia

Lead figures
John L. Lewis	Thomas Kilby

Casualties and losses
- Deaths: 16+ Injuries: Arrests: Deaths: 2 Injuries:

The 1920 Alabama coal strike, or the Alabama miners' strike, was a statewide strike of the United Mine Workers of America against coal mine operators. The strike was marked by racial violence, and ended in significant defeat for the union and organized labor in Alabama.

== Conditions ==
UMW president John L. Lewis authorized the calling of a general strike on September 1, and the strike formally began at midnight on September 8. As many as 15,000 of the 27,000 coal miners in the state stopped work. UMW vice-president Van Bittner was sent to the state to oversee the effort.

The main union demands were union recognition, and that the operators put into effect the wage award decided by the Bituminous Coal Commission earlier in the year. One obstacle to union recognition, was animosity to the union due to the UMW's racial integration. Popular opinion in Alabama was turned against the strikers almost immediately, particularly the disapproving black middle class, who saw racial solidarity and cooperation with capitalists as their only route to economic self-defense. Coal operators launched a propaganda campaign to divide the union along racial lines. A pro-employer newspaper called the Workmen’s Chronicle was distributed free of cost to mine workers. It was published by a black minister named P. C. Rameau who worked out of an office in the TCI building. Oscar W. Adams Sr., editor of the Birmingham Reporter, spoke to workers in company-owned halls, imploring them to remain loyal to mine owners.

Major operators in Alabama's coalfields were also still using convict labor with no salary cost whatsoever, the convict leasing system, described by some as "Slavery by Another Name". Mines of the Tennessee Coal, Iron and Railroad Company had phased out convict leasing five years after its acquisition by U.S. Steel, but the mines controlled by Sloss Furnaces and Pratt Consolidated continued the practice until 1926.

== The strike ==
The strike's first major confrontation happened on September 16, in Patton Junction, Alabama (in Walker County), where strikers killed the general manager of the Corona Coal Company, Leon Adler, along with Earl Edgil, a deputy sheriff. But African Americans bore the brunt of the violence: among many such threatening incidents, black miner Henry Junius was found in a shallow grave outside of Roebuck a few weeks into the strike. At least thirteen houses of strikebreakers were dynamited between September and December. Also in December, state troopers terrorized the small black business district in Pratt City with random machine gun fire.

The Alabama State Militia and the state police had been called out by the governor, Thomas Kilby, known as the "business governor". Once on site, state troop commanders typically placed themselves at the service of the coal companies. By February, thousands of workers had been evicted from their company houses and left homeless.

Towards the end of February, the enormous expense of conducting the strike with no progress led the union to seek a resolution. None other than Governor Kilby was accepted as arbitrator. Kilby's settlement flatly refused union recognition and any wage increases, and he refused to reinstate striking miners. Part of Kilby's March 9 decision read:

It is rather difficult to understand how such a large number of men could be induced so deliberately to disregard such an obligation of honor. The only explanation, perhaps, lies in the fact that from 70 per cent to 80 per cent of the miners are Negroes. The southern Negro is easily misled, especially when given a permanent and official place in an organization in which both races are members.

The national UMW chose to adhere to Kilby's decision. After the strike ended union advances stagnated; by the end of the decade, the UMW would close its state offices. At least 16 people were killed in the strike, more than half of them black, with an uncounted number of wounded.

=== Willie Baird ===
On December 22, 1920, local union official and itinerant Nazarine minister Adrian Northcutt of Nauvoo, Alabama was summoned out of his home by soldiers of Company M of the Alabama National Guard. After hearing seven shots fired in quick succession, Northcutt's son-in-law William (Willie) Baird rushed out to find Northcutt, dead on the ground, with Private James Morris standing over him. Baird shot Morris in self-defense, then fled into the woods. After three days, Baird turned himself over to Walker County officials. On January 5, nine guardsmen of Company M entered the jail, subdued the sheriff on duty, lynched Baird, and riddled his body with bullets.

The guardsmen were eventually acquitted. Former Alabama governor Braxton Bragg Comer would claim that the lynching of Baird "had some element of self-defense in it."

== See also ==
- List of worker deaths in United States labor disputes
- UMW General coal strike (1922)

== Works cited ==
- Kelly, Brian (2001). Race, Class, and Power in the Alabama Coalfields, 1908-21. Urbana: University of Illinois Press. ISBN 9780252069338.
- Lewis, Ronald L. (2009). Black coal miners in America : race, class, and community conflict, 1780-1980. Lexington, Kentucky: University Press of Kentucky. ISBN 9780813192741.
- Foner, Philip S. (1991). History of the labor movement in the United States. Vol. 9, The T.U.E.L. to the end of the Gompers Era. New York: International Publishers. ISBN 9780717806744.
- Tindall, George B. (1995). The emergence of the New South 1913-1945. Baton Rouge, Louisiana: Louisiana State University Press. ISBN 9780807100202.
- Woodrum, Robert H. (2007). "Everybody was black down there" : race and industrial change in the Alabama coalfields. Athens: University of Georgia Press. ISBN 9780820328799.
