= Myrtlewood, Alabama =

- Town
- Location in Marengo County, Alabama
- Coordinates: 32°14′56″N 87°56′54″W
- Country: United States
- State: Alabama
- County: Marengo

Area
  - Total: 2.60 sq mi (6.7 km^{2})
  - Land: 2.60 sq mi (6.7 km^{2})
  - Water: 0.00 sq mi (0 km^{2})
- Elevation: 203 ft (62 m)

Population (2020)
  - Total: 70
  - Density: 26.97/sq mi (10.41/km^{2})
- Time zone: UTC-6 (Central (CST))
  - Summer (DST): UTC-5 (CDT)
- ZIP code: 36763
- Area code: 334
- FIPS code: 01-53112
- GNIS feature ID: 2406222

Myrtlewood is a town in Marengo County, Alabama, United States. At the 2020 census the population was 70, down from 130 in 2010. In Fosters, Alabama, there is also a school with the name Myrtlewood.

== History ==
A post office has been in operation at Myrtlewood since 1886. Myrtlewood was incorporated as a town in 1957. The town was named for a grove of crepe myrtle trees near the original town site.

== Geography ==
Myrtlewood is located in western Marengo County along Alabama State Route 114. It is 11 miles (18 km) southwest of Linden, the county seat, and 7 miles (11 km) northeast of Pennington in Choctaw County.

According to the U.S. Census Bureau, the town has a total area of 2.6 square miles (6.7 km^{2}), all land. The town sits on high ground 100 feet (30 m) above the valley of the Tombigbee River, which flows southwards 3 miles (5 km) to the west.

== Demographics ==
Historical population
Census	Pop.	Note	%±
1960	403		—
1970	334		−17.1%
1980	252		−24.6%
1990	197		−21.8%
2000	139		−29.4%
2010	130		−6.5%
2020	70		−46.2%
U.S. Decennial Census; 2013 Estimate

=== Racial and ethnic composition ===
Myrtlewood town, Alabama – Racial and ethnic composition Note: the US Census treats Hispanic/Latino as an ethnic category. This table excludes Latinos from the racial categories and assigns them to a separate category. Hispanics/Latinos may be of any race.
Race / Ethnicity (NH = Non-Hispanic)	Pop 2000	Pop 2010	Pop 2020	% 2000	% 2010	% 2020
White alone (NH)	110	107	62	79.14%	82.31%	88.57%
Black or African American alone (NH)	28	18	3	20.14%	13.85%	4.29%
Native American or Alaska Native alone (NH)	0	0	0	0.00%	0.00%	0.00%
Asian alone (NH)	0	0	0	0.00%	0.00%	0.00%
Native Hawaiian or Pacific Islander alone (NH)	0	0	0	0.00%	0.00%	0.00%
Other race alone (NH)	0	0	0	0.00%	0.00%	0.00%
Mixed race or Multiracial (NH)	0	1	2	0.00%	0.77%	2.86%
Hispanic or Latino (any race)	1	4	3	0.72%	3.08%	4.29%
Total	139	130	70	100.00%	100.00%	100.00%

=== 2000 census ===
As of the census of 2000, there were 139 people, 59 households, and 45 families residing in the town. The population density was 53.6 inhabitants per square mile (20.7/km^{2}). There were 76 housing units at an average density of 29.3 per square mile (11.3/km^{2}). The racial makeup of the town was 79.14% White and 20.86% Black or African American. 0.72% of the population were Hispanic or Latino of any race.

There were 59 households, out of which 22.0% had children under the age of 18 living with them, 61.0% were married couples living together, 10.2% had a female householder with no husband present, and 23.7% were non-families. 23.7% of all households were made up of individuals, and 6.8% had someone living alone who was 65 years of age or older. The average household size was 2.36 and the average family size was 2.76.

In the town, the population was spread out, with 18.7% under the age of 18, 5.8% from 18 to 24, 25.9% from 25 to 44, 30.2% from 45 to 64, and 19.4% who were 65 years of age or older. The median age was 44 years. For every 100 females, there were 95.8 males. For every 100 females age 18 and over, there were 98.2 males.

The median income for a household in the town was $42,188, and the median income for a family was $50,114. Males had a median income of $51,667 versus $31,250 for females. The per capita income for the town was $21,262. There were 4.8% of families and 7.3% of the population living below the poverty line, including 7.1% of under eighteens and 13.0% of those over 64.
