= Olustee =

Olustee may refer to:

- Olustee, Alabama, a populated place near in Pike County, Alabama
- Olustee, Florida, a town in Baker County, Florida
  - Battle of Olustee, the largest battle fought in Florida during the American Civil War
  - Olustee Creek, a tributary of the Santa Fe River near Olustee
- Olustee, Oklahoma, a town in Jackson County, Oklahoma
