= Barrytown, Alabama =

Unincorporated community in Alabama, United States

- Unincorporated community
- Location within Alabama Location within the United States
- Coordinates: 31°50′15″N 88°15′10″W
- Country: United States
- State: Alabama
- County: Choctaw
- Elevation: 112 ft (34 m)
- Time zone: UTC-6 (Central (CST))
  - Summer (DST): UTC-5 (CDT)
- Area codes: 205 and 659
- GNIS feature ID: 157885

Barrytown, also known as Barryton or Mosely Store, is an unincorporated community in Choctaw County, Alabama, United States.

== History ==
The name Barrytown comes from the combination of the words barrel and town, as the area was known for the production of turpentine barrels. Barrytown served as the county seat of Washington County from 1842 to 1847 until Choctaw County was formed from parts of Washington and Sumter County. A post office operated in Barrytown from 1833 to 1914.
