= Eliza Battle =

Tombigbee River steamboat (1852–1858)

History
- Name: Eliza Battle
- Operator: Cox, Brainard and Company
- Route: Tombigbee River between Columbus, Mississippi and Mobile, Alabama
- Completed: 1852
- In service: 1852
- Out of service: 1858
- Fate: Caught fire and sank March 1, 1858

General characteristics
- Type: Side-wheeled paddle steamer
- Tonnage: 316 tons

The Eliza Battle was a Tombigbee River steamboat that ran a route between Columbus, Mississippi, and Mobile, Alabama, in the United States during the 1850s. She was destroyed in a fire on the river near modern Pennington, Alabama, on March 1, 1858. It was the greatest maritime disaster in Tombigbee River history, with an estimated 33 people killed, out of roughly 60 passengers and a crew of 45. The disaster and its aftermath caused the Eliza Battle to enter southwestern Alabama folklore as a ghost ship, with numerous purported sightings of the burning ship from just north of Pennington to Nanafalia downriver. The story of the disaster and associated folklore has been fictionalized in several published short stories, most notably in "The Phantom Steamboat of the Tombigbee" in 13 Alabama Ghosts and Jeffrey.

== Background ==
The Eliza Battle was launched in New Albany, Indiana, in 1852. A side-wheeled paddle steamer, the wooden-hulled ship had a size of 316 tons. She was operated out of Mobile, Alabama by the firm of Cox, Brainard, and Company. One of the most luxurious riverboats plying the state's waters at that time, former President Millard Fillmore was entertained during a reception on board the ship in Mobile on April 7, 1854.

== Disaster ==
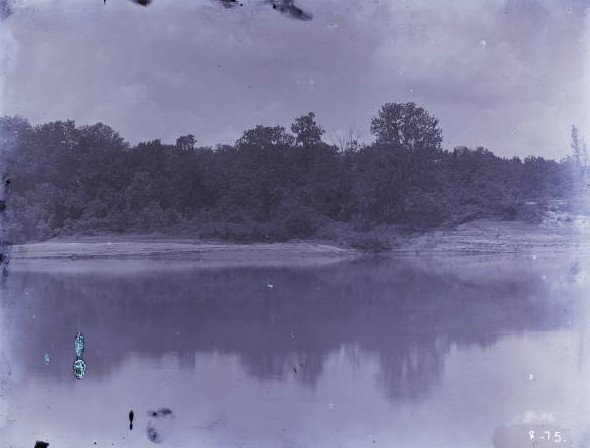
An 1888 photograph of the Tombigbee River below Moscow Landing, near the site of the disaster

Captained by S. Graham Stone and with Daniel Epps as pilot, the Eliza Battle departed Columbus in the last days of February 1858. Only able to negotiate the Tombigbee that far north during the regular flooding of the river during the winter, the ship made its way downriver with stops at Pickensville, Gainesville, Demopolis, and numerous small river landings. By the time the ship left Demopolis, on February 28, 1858, she was fully loaded with passengers and more than 1200 bales of cotton. During an already cold night, a strong north wind began to blow, with the air temperature decreasing another 40 °F in the two hours after nightfall.

At roughly 2:00 am on March 1, 1858, about 32 miles (51 km) downriver from Demopolis, near Beckley's Landing (32.28486°N 87.92779°W), cotton bales on the main deck were discovered to be on fire. Partially attributed to the strong winds, the fire soon spread out of control. The boat continued downstream out of control. Cut off from the lifeboat by the flames, the passengers, dressed only in their nightclothes, were forced to seek refuge in the icy river. Some survived by floating atop cotton bales. The Eliza Battle finally came to rest above Kemp's Landing (32.24359°N 88.01238°W), near the modern Alabama State Route 114 bridge over the river near Pennington. The survivors were rescued by the Magnolia and local residents, with some passengers having to be retrieved from treetops along the flooded river. All of the casualties were attributed to drowning or exposure to the extreme cold during the night. The ship sank below the waters of the Tombigbee following the disaster, with the hull of the wreck remaining on the river bottom in 28 ft (8.5 m) of water to the present day.

== Folklore ==
In Kathryn Tucker Windham's 13 Alabama Ghosts and Jeffrey, the disaster and folklore concerning the ghost ship is recorded as "The Phantom Steamboat of the Tombigbee". The story roughly follows newspaper accounts of the disaster. It is purported in the story that sightings of the ship tend to happen on cold and windy winter nights, with the ship, fully engulfed in flames, appearing on the river near the same locations where the disaster occurred. It also relates that the sightings are said by river-men to foretell of impending disaster and are an ill omen to ships still plying the river.

== See also ==
- James T. Staples
