= Cullomburg, Alabama =

- Census-designated place
- Location of Cullomburg in Choctaw County and Washington County, Alabama.
- Coordinates: 31°42′47″N 88°17′30″W
- Country: United States
- State: Alabama
- County: Choctaw

Area
  - Total: 5.34 sq mi (13.84 km^{2})
  - Land: 5.34 sq mi (13.84 km^{2})
  - Water: 0 sq mi (0.00 km^{2})
- Elevation: 226 ft (69 m)

Population (2020)
  - Total: 126
  - Density: 24/sq mi (9.1/km^{2})
- Time zone: UTC-6 (Central (CST))
  - Summer (DST): UTC-5 (CDT)
- Area code: 251
- GNIS feature ID: 2628586

Cullomburg is a census-designated place and unincorporated community in Choctaw and Washington counties, Alabama, United States. Its population was 126 as of the 2020 census.

== Demographics ==
Historical population
| Census | Pop. | Note | %± |
|---|---|---|---|
| 2010 | 171 | | — |
| 2020 | 126 | | −26.3% |
U.S. Decennial Census; 2010 2020

Cullomburg was first listed as a census designated place in the 2010 U.S. census.

Cullomburg CDP, Alabama – Racial and ethnic composition Note: the US Census treats Hispanic/Latino as an ethnic category. This table excludes Latinos from the racial categories and assigns them to a separate category. Hispanics/Latinos may be of any race.
| Race / Ethnicity (NH = Non-Hispanic) | Pop 2010 | Pop 2020 | % 2010 | % 2020 |
|---|---|---|---|---|
| White alone (NH) | 72 | 64 | 42.11% | 50.79% |
| Black or African American alone (NH) | 98 | 52 | 57.31% | 41.27% |
| Native American or Alaska Native alone (NH) | 0 | 0 | 0.00% | 0.00% |
| Asian alone (NH) | 0 | 0 | 0.00% | 0.00% |
| Native Hawaiian or Pacific Islander alone (NH) | 0 | 0 | 0.00% | 0.00% |
| Other race alone (NH) | 0 | 1 | 0.00% | 0.79% |
| Mixed race or Multiracial (NH) | 1 | 5 | 0.58% | 3.97% |
| Hispanic or Latino (any race) | 0 | 4 | 0.00% | 3.17% |
| Total | 171 | 126 | 100.00% | 100.00% |
