= Alabama State Route 114 =

Highway in Alabama

State Route 114

Route information
- Maintained by ALDOT
- Length: 14.251 mi (22.935 km)
- Existed: 1963–present

Major junctions
- West end: SR 10 east of Butler
- SR 156 in Pennington
- East end: SR 69 in Myrtlewood

Location
- Country: United States
- State: Alabama
- Counties: Choctaw, Marengo

Highway system
- Alabama State Highway System; Interstate; US; State
← SR 113	→ SR 115

State Route 114 (SR 114) is a 14.251-mile-long (22.935 km) state highway in the southwestern part of the U.S. state of Alabama. The western terminus of the highway is at an intersection with SR 10 near Lavaca, an unincorporated community approximately 11 miles (18 km) east of Butler. The eastern terminus of the highway is at an intersection with SR 69 at Myrtlewood.

== Route description ==
SR 114 travels northeast through rural parts of Choctaw and Marengo counties. The highway travels through sections of Alabama's Black Belt, one of the poorest regions of the state. It serves as a leg of the route between Butler and Linden and travels primarily through rural areas and unincorporated communities. The only incorporated towns the route traverses are Pennington and Myrtlewood.

== History ==
The route was designated in 1963 along the former route of Choctaw County Route 32 (Choctaw CR 32).

Until 2000, the old Naheola Bridge on SR 114 near the unincorporated town of Naheola was one of only two bridges in the world where rail and road traffic shared the same surface. Traffic signals were mounted at either end of the bridge, controlled from the lift bridge operator stationed on top of the lift, that signaled to cars when it was safe to cross.

The bridge was closed to road traffic in 2000, and in 2001 the Highway Department constructed a new bridge for SR 114 parallel to the old Naheola Bridge.

== Major intersections ==
County	Location	mi	km	Destinations	Notes
Choctaw	Lavaca	0.000	0.000	SR 10 – Butler	Western terminus
Choctaw	Pennington	5.643	9.082	SR 156 west	Eastern terminus of SR 156
Marengo	Myrtlewood	14.251	22.935	SR 69 – Linden	Eastern terminus
1.000 mi = 1.609 km; 1.000 km = 0.621 mi
