= Mount Sterling, Alabama =

Unincorporated community in Alabama, United States

- Unincorporated community
- Location within the state of Alabama Mount Sterling, Alabama (the United States)
- Coordinates: 32°5′37″N 88°9′47″W
- Country: United States
- State: Alabama
- County: Choctaw
- Elevation: 164 ft (50 m)
- Time zone: UTC-6 (Central (CST))
  - Summer (DST): UTC-5 (CDT)
- Area codes: 205, 659

Mount Sterling is an unincorporated community in Choctaw County, Alabama, United States. Mount Sterling was once a prosperous antebellum community, with an economy based on cotton and timber, but today little is left other than a few scattered houses. One church building, the Mount Sterling Methodist Church, is listed on the National Register of Historic Places.

Mount Sterling's population as an unincorporated community was listed as 126 at the 1880 U.S. Census, the only time a figure was returned.

== Demographics ==
Historical population
| Census | Pop. | Note | %± |
|---|---|---|---|
| 1880 | 126 | | — |
U.S. Decennial Census

== Geography ==
Mount Sterling is located at 32.09375°N 88.16307°W and has an elevation of 164 feet (50 m).
