= Spring Hill, Choctaw County, Alabama =

Unincorporated community in Alabama, United States

Spring Hill, Alabama
- Unincorporated community
- Location within Alabama Location within the United States
- Coordinates: 31°56′50″N 88°08′14″W
- Country: United States
- State: Alabama
- County: Choctaw
- Elevation: 364 ft (111 m)
- Time zone: UTC-6 (Central (CST))
  - Summer (DST): UTC-5 (CDT)
- Area codes: 205, 659
- GNIS feature ID: 127236

Spring Hill is an unincorporated community in Choctaw County, Alabama, United States. Spring Hill is located along County Route 23, 11 miles (18 km) south-southeast of Butler.
