= Robjohn, Alabama =

Unincorporated community in Alabama, United States

- Unincorporated community
- Location within Alabama Location within the United States
- Coordinates: 32°12′51″N 88°07′38″W
- Country: United States
- State: Alabama
- County: Choctaw
- Elevation: 98 ft (30 m)
- Time zone: UTC-6 (Central (CST))
  - Summer (DST): UTC-5 (CDT)
- Area codes: 205, 659
- GNIS feature ID: 125740

Robjohn is an unincorporated community in Choctaw County, Alabama, United States. Robjohn is located on Alabama State Route 156, 4.5 miles (7.2 km) west of Pennington. Robjohn had a post office, which opened on July 14, 1888, and closed on January 31, 1955.
