= Melvin, Alabama =

Unincorporated community in Alabama, United States

- Unincorporated community
- Location within Alabama Location within the United States
- Coordinates: 31°55′50″N 88°27′32″W
- Country: United States
- State: Alabama
- County: Choctaw
- Elevation: 348 ft (106 m)
- Time zone: UTC-6 (Central (CST))
  - Summer (DST): UTC-5 (CDT)
- ZIP code: 36913
- Area codes: 205, 659
- GNIS feature ID: 152299

Melvin is an unincorporated community in Choctaw County, Alabama, United States. Its ZIP code is 36913.
