= Edna, Alabama =

Unincorporated community in Alabama, United States

- Unincorporated community
- Location within Alabama Location within the United States
- Coordinates: 32°17′13″N 88°04′27″W
- Country: United States
- State: Alabama
- County: Choctaw
- Elevation: 98 ft (30 m)
- Time zone: UTC-6 (Central (CST))
  - Summer (DST): UTC-5 (CDT)
- Area codes: 205 and 659
- GNIS feature ID: 156299

Edna is an unincorporated community in Choctaw County, Alabama, United States.

== History ==
A post office operated under the name Edna from 1910 to 1959.

The Pelham United Methodist Church, located in Edna, is listed on the Alabama Register of Landmarks and Heritage.
