= James T. Staples =

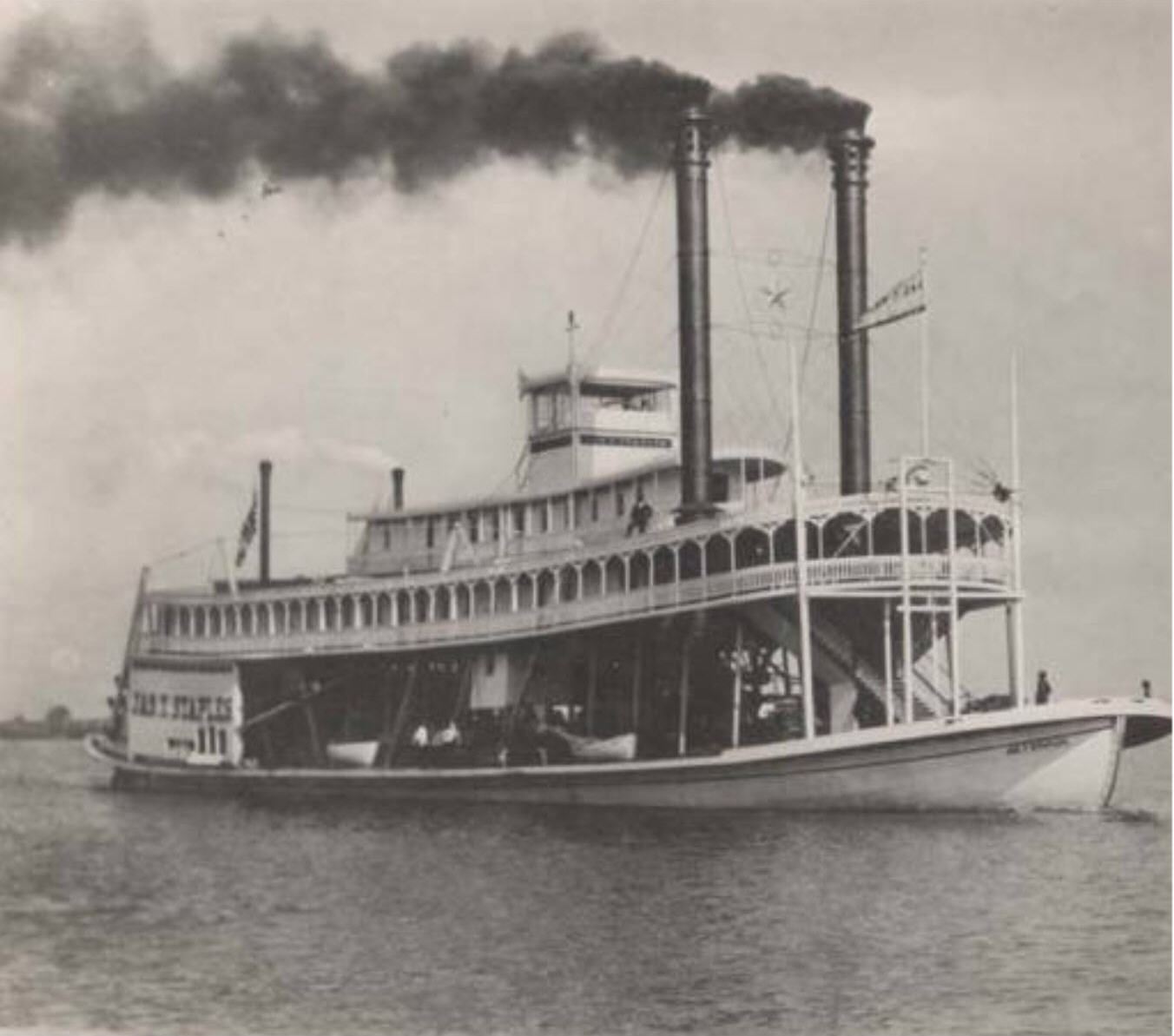
- The James T. Staples on the river

History
- Name: James T. Staples
- Owner: Norman A. Staples
- Route: Tombigbee River, between Mobile and Demopolis, Alabama
- Cost: $40,000
- In service: 1908
- Out of service: 1913
- Fate: Sunk by boiler explosion January 10, 1913

General characteristics
- Type: Stern-wheeled paddle steamer
- Length: 207.2 feet (63.2 m)
- Beam: 35.6 feet (10.9 m)
- Depth: 5 feet (1.5 m)

James T. Staples, officially registered as the Jas. T. Staples and also known as the Big Jim, was a Tombigbee River sternwheel paddle steamer that ran a route between Mobile and Demopolis, Alabama, during the early 20th century. She was destroyed during 1913 in an explosion while docked on the Tombigbee, roughly six miles (10 km) north of the current Coffeeville Lock and Dam. It was the last major maritime disaster involving a steamboat in Tombigbee River history. The disaster caused the ship to enter southwestern Alabama folklore, with tales that its sinking had been foretold by supernatural occurrences.

== History ==
James T. Staples was completed at a cost of $40,000 in Mobile during 1908. She was large enough to carry a cargo of 2,500 bales of cotton (562.5 tonnes). The ship was owned by Captain Norman A. Staples, son of James T. and Mary Staples. Staples ran into financial problems in 1912, leading his creditors to take possession of the ship in late December 1912. Staples killed himself with a shotgun on January 2, 1913. He was buried in the main cemetery at Bladon Springs, Alabama. One week after his death, on January 10, 1913, his former steamboat was destroyed in a boiler explosion while about four miles (6.5 km) away from Bladon Springs, at Powes Landing (31.81598°N 88.18167°W). In the disaster, 26 people were killed and 21 were injured. The survivors were rescued by the crew of the John Quill, another large sternwheeler plying the same circuit. The explosion was variously blamed on human error and sabotage; neither was ever proven. The hull, engines, and two boilers were later salvaged from the river and used to build the Peerless, launched in 1914.

== Folklore ==
A story began to circulate soon after the disaster that crewmen had abandoned the engine room after seeing an apparition under the boilers. Another story printed on several occasions stated that an old man, claimed to be a prophet by townspeople in Coffeeville, had foretold of the disaster. Kathryn Tucker Windham immortalized the supposedly supernatural aspects of the disaster with the short story "The James T. Staples, Doomed Steamboat of the Tombigbee" in her Jeffrey's Latest 13 More Alabama Ghosts.

== See also ==
- Eliza Battle
