= Mount Sterling Methodist Church =

Historic church in Alabama, United States

- U.S. National Register of Historic Places
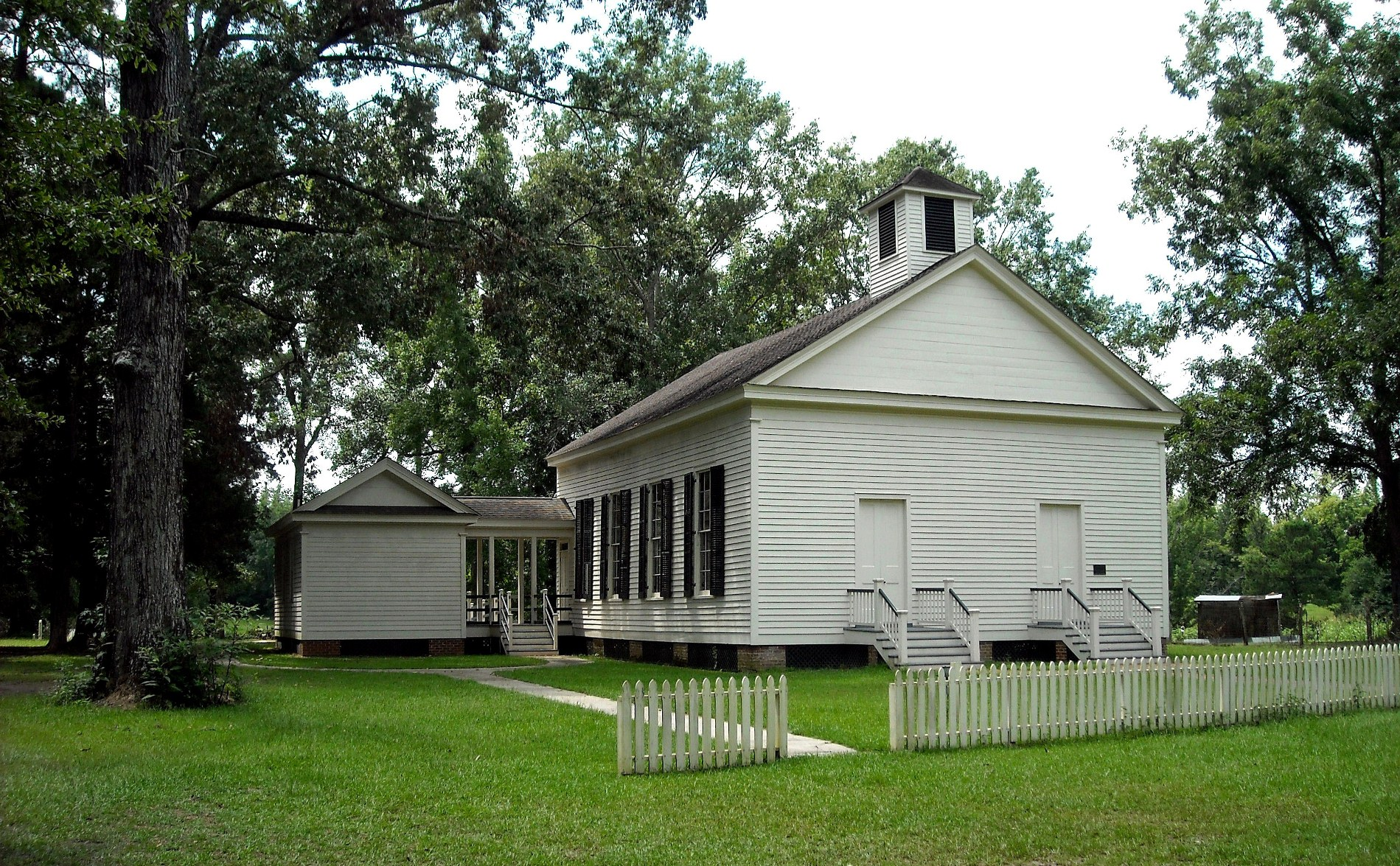
- The church in August 2009

- Location within Alabama Location within the United States
- Location: Near jct. of CR 43 and CR 27, Mount Sterling, Alabama
- Coordinates: 32°5′28″N 88°9′49″W
- Area: 2 acres (0.81 ha)
- Built: 1859
- Architectural style: Greek Revival
- NRHP reference No.: 86000995
- Added to NRHP: May 8, 1986

Mount Sterling Methodist Church is a historic Methodist church building near the junction of Choctaw County Road 43 and Choctaw County Road 27 in the rural community of Mount Sterling, Alabama, United States. It is an almost unaltered example of the simple, Greek Revival style popular for rural churches in the mid-19th century. It was added to the National Register of Historic Places on May 8, 1986.

== History ==
The church was completed in a simple Greek Revival style in 1859, when the community was a prosperous antebellum town. The land for the church was donated by the Catterlin family, early Choctaw County settlers who had established the a post office in Mount Sterling in 1838. The one-story frame building was the first in the county to be built exclusively as a church; an earlier Baptist church was originally built as a Masonic lodge and seminary. It used for church services up until the 1970s, when the dwindling congregation could no longer afford to maintain it. In 1980, the property was donated to the Choctaw County Historical Society. The historical society, at the time having only just under 50 members, spent more than 15 years raising money and restoring the structure for use as a community hall. It is one of only two remaining 19th century churches in the Mount Sterling area, the other being St. John's Christian Methodist Episcopal Church.

== Architecture ==
The church is a rectangular structure with a gable roof running the length of the building. It sits on individual brick piers. The exterior is clad in lap board siding painted white. The front façade has two pairs of entry doors under the plain gable-end pediment. Each side has four, nine-over-nine sash windows with shutters, while the rear has two such windows. The square, pyramidal roofed steeple sits near the entrance end of the building, and is clad is lap board with vents in each side. A small addition, with details closely matching the main building, has been built off the southeast side of the church, with a covered walkway connecting it to the main building.

The interior consists of one large room that was partitioned on the south end in the 1950s to create two Sunday school rooms. The roof support system is unique to southwest Alabama, and consists of a single truss with vertical tie rods running the length of the building, which is notched to be attached to the ceiling joists and diagonal trusses. This has caused the bottom chord to crack, and wood columns were added underneath the cracked portion. The original lath and plaster walls have been replaced with drywall, but the original heart pine flooring is intact.
