= Pearce's Mill =

- U.S. National Register of Historic Places
- U.S. Historic district
- Location within Alabama Location within the United States
- Nearest city: Hamilton, Alabama
- Coordinates: 34°7′19″N 87°50′14″W
- Area: 15.3 acres (6.2 ha)
- Built: 1875
- NRHP reference No.: 76000343
- Added to NRHP: October 8, 1976

Pearce's Mill is a former mill site east of Hamilton in Marion County, Alabama. The mill was founded along the Buttahatchee River in the 1840s, before being abandoned during the Civil War. James P. Pearce returned to the mill in 1865 and developed it into an economic center in the region. At its height in the 1870s, the complex hosted a general store with a post office, a gristmill, sawmill, flour mill, and cotton gin, in addition to the family house. Pearce's mule teams carried the mills' production to market in Tuscumbia. as improved roads and railroads drove commerce to Hamilton and other nearby towns, the store closed in 1930, and the mills ceased operation in 1959.

The mills were demolished in 1970 for safety reasons, however the dam and portions of the gristmill remain. The family home, built in 1878, was initially a two-room dogtrot structure. Rooms were added in the early 1900s and in 1916, a second floor was constructed. Stone fireplaces were added in the 1930s by the Works Progress Administration. Other remaining structures on the site include the two-story Victorian general store, built in the early 1870s; a tenant farmers' house; a former blacksmith shop; a barn; a shed; the family cemetery; and an abandoned bridge.

The complex was listed on the National Register of Historic Places in 1976.

== Demographics ==
Pearce's Mills appeared on the 1880 U.S. Census as an unincorporated community (village) of 70 residents. This was the only time it appeared on census rolls.

Historical population
Census	Pop.	Note	%±
1880	70		—
U.S. Decennial Census
