= Jachin, Alabama =

Unincorporated community in Alabama, United States

- Unincorporated community
- Location within Alabama Location within the United States
- Coordinates: 32°13′48″N 88°10′06″W
- Country: United States
- State: Alabama
- County: Choctaw
- Elevation: 108 ft (33 m)
- Time zone: UTC-6 (Central (CST))
  - Summer (DST): UTC-5 (CDT)
- ZIP code: 36910
- Area codes: 205, 659
- GNIS feature ID: 155114

Jachin is an unincorporated community in Choctaw County, Alabama, United States. Jachin is located at the junction of Alabama State Route 17 and Alabama State Route 156, 10.2 miles (16.4 km) north-northeast of Butler. Jachin had a post office, which opened on March 19, 1892, and closed on February 27, 1993.
