= Needmore, Alabama =

- Unincorporated community
- Location within Alabama Location within the United States
- Coordinates: 31°54′08″N 85°56′27″W
- Country: United States
- State: Alabama
- County: Pike
- Elevation: 459 ft (140 m)
- Time zone: UTC-6 (Central (CST))
  - Summer (DST): UTC-5 (CDT)
- Area code: 334
- GNIS feature ID: 152593

Needmore, also known as Rough Log, is an unincorporated community in Pike County, Alabama, United States.

== History ==
Needmore is reportedly derived from a local resident who thought the community "needed more of everything." The community was initially known as Rough Log, due to the rapid construction of Pleasant Hill Primitive Baptist Church.
