= Patton, Alabama =

- Unincorporated community
- Location within Alabama Location within the United States
- Coordinates: 33°42′02″N 87°27′17″W
- Country: United States
- State: Alabama
- County: Walker
- Elevation: 325 ft (99 m)
- Time zone: UTC-6 (Central (CST))
  - Summer (DST): UTC-5 (CDT)
- Area codes: 205, 659
- GNIS feature ID: 152855

Patton was an unincorporated community in Walker County, in the U.S. state of Alabama. "Patton" and "Patton Junction" are often treated as different names for a single community.

Patton was originally a coal camp serving the mines of the Deer Creek Coal Company, while nearby Patton Junction served the mines of the Virginia and Alabama Coal Company. The two towns were 1.1 miles (1.8 km) apart on a spur line of the Southern Railway. The Corona Coal Company also later operated a mine at Patton.

In 1887, 1300 workers at Patton went on strike against Virginia and Alabama Coal after the company refused to raise pay from 65 to 75 cents per ton. The Alabama Knights of Labor intervened and revoked the local union's charter for refusing to submit to arbitration, and the strike ended inconclusively after more than five months.

From 1897 to 1904, Patton Junction was home to The Patton Pointer, an African American weekly newspaper edited by J.T. Nall. It was Walker County's only African American newspaper at the time, and one of only three newspapers in Walker County overall.

In the 1920 Alabama coal strike, a deadly confrontation occurred at Patton between striking miners and Corona Coal Company bosses, leaving three coal company personnel dead. The state government retaliated by sending 500 troops against the miners.

== Works cited ==
- Letwin, Daniel (1998). The Challenge of Interracial Unionism: Alabama Coal Miners, 1878-1921. University of North Carolina Press. ISBN 9780807846780.
