= Needham, Alabama =

- Town
- Location of Needham in Choctaw County, Alabama.
- Coordinates: 31°59′13″N 88°20′12″W
- Country: United States
- State: Alabama
- County: Choctaw

Area
  - Total: 0.57 sq mi (1.48 km^{2})
  - Land: 0.57 sq mi (1.48 km^{2})
  - Water: 0 sq mi (0.00 km^{2})
- Elevation: 167 ft (51 m)

Population (2020)
  - Total: 73
  - Density: 127.5/sq mi (49.24/km^{2})
- Time zone: UTC-6 (Central (CST))
  - Summer (DST): UTC-5 (CDT)
- ZIP code: 36915
- Area codes: 205, 659
- FIPS code: 01-53472
- GNIS feature ID: 2406970

Needham is a town in Choctaw County, Alabama, United States. It incorporated in 1981. At the 2020 census, the population was 73.

== Geography ==
Needham is located near the center of Choctaw County.

According to the U.S. Census Bureau, the town has a total area of 0.58 square miles (1.5 km^{2}), all land.

== Demographics ==
Historical population
Census	Pop.	Note	%±
1990	99		—
2000	97		−2.0%
2010	94		−3.1%
2020	73		−22.3%
U.S. Decennial Census

As of the census of 2000, there were 97 people, 39 households, and 32 families residing in the town. The population density was 169.4 inhabitants per square mile (65.4/km^{2}). There were 46 housing units at an average density of 80.3 per square mile (31.0/km^{2}). The racial makeup of the town was 100.00% White.

There were 39 households, out of which 30.8% had children under the age of 18 living with them, 71.8% were married couples living together, 10.3% had a female householder with no husband present, and 17.9% were non-families. 17.9% of all households were made up of individuals, and 12.8% had someone living alone who was 65 years of age or older. The average household size was 2.49 and the average family size was 2.81.

In the town, the population was spread out, with 20.6% under the age of 18, 4.1% from 18 to 24, 29.9% from 25 to 44, 26.8% from 45 to 64, and 18.6% who were 65 years of age or older. The median age was 42 years. For every 100 females, there were 98.0 males. For every 100 females age 18 and over, there were 92.5 males.

The median income for a household in the town was $38,750, and the median income for a family was $42,083. Males had a median income of $35,417 versus $21,250 for females. The per capita income for the town was $16,764. There were 12.1% of families and 11.6% of the population living below the poverty line, including no under eighteens and 11.1% of those over 64.
