= Ruthven, Alabama =

Unincorporated community in Alabama, United States

- Ghost town
- Location within the state of Alabama Ruthven, Alabama (the United States)
- Coordinates: 31°51′13″N 87°01′47″W
- Country: United States
- State: Alabama
- County: Wilcox
- Elevation: 230 ft (70 m)
- Time zone: UTC-6 (Central (CST))
  - Summer (DST): UTC-5 (CDT)
- Area code: 334

Ruthven is a ghost town in Wilcox County, Alabama. Ruthven is named in honor of Ruthven, a division of Lincolnshire. It was formerly a lumber town in the early 20th century, and was incorporated in 1924. It was located about 3 1/2 miles southwest of Pine Apple on Bear Creek along the Selma to Flomaton branch of the Louisville & Nashville Railroad, what is now County Road 2. In 1930, it had 523 residents, making it the second largest town in Wilcox County after the county seat of Camden. Shortly afterwards, the town either disincorporated or lost its charter and rapidly declined. Very little exists of the town today as most of its buildings were dismantled. A post office was also located at Ruthven for a time.

Nearby to Ruthven was the community of Schuster, which was once the location of the Wilcox Mineral Springs Resort.

== Demographics ==
Historical population
Census	Pop.	Note	%±
1930	523		—
U.S. Decennial Census

Ruthven appeared on the U.S. Census of 1930 as an incorporated community. It disincorporated or lost its charter at some point later in the decade.

== Geography ==
Ruthven is located at 31.8534850°N 87.0297059°W and has an elevation of 230 feet (70 m).
