= Riderwood, Alabama =

Unincorporated community in Alabama, United States

- Unincorporated community
- Location within Alabama Location within the United States
- Coordinates: 32°07′44″N 88°19′40″W
- Country: United States
- State: Alabama
- County: Choctaw
- Elevation: 213 ft (65 m)
- Time zone: UTC-6 (Central (CST))
  - Summer (DST): UTC-5 (CDT)
- Area codes: 205 and 659
- GNIS feature ID: 125626

Riderwood is an unincorporated community in Choctaw County, Alabama, United States.

== History ==
Riderwood is named after J. B. Rider, who was the president of the E. E. Jackson Lumber Company. Riderwood was founded by the E. E. Jackson Lumber Company and was located on the Alabama, Tennessee and Northern Railroad. Riderwood was formerly an incorporated town. It was also home to a company store, theater, and hotel.

The Alabama Department of Public Health carried out malaria control operations in Riderwood beginning in 1918.

A post office operated under the name Riderwood from 1916 to 1974.

The Riderwood Union Church was built by the E. E. Jackson Lumber Company for its workers and is listed on the Alabama Register of Landmarks and Heritage.
