= Red Level, Montgomery County, Alabama =

Red Level, Alabama
- Unincorporated community
- Location within Alabama Location within the United States
- Coordinates: 32°08′04″N 86°13′24″W
- Country: United States
- State: Alabama
- County: Montgomery
- Elevation: 344 ft (105 m)
- Time zone: UTC-6 (Central (CST))
  - Summer (DST): UTC-5 (CDT)
- Area code: 334
- GNIS feature ID: 156949

Red Level is an unincorporated community in Montgomery County, Alabama, United States.
