= Nauvoo, Alabama =

- Town
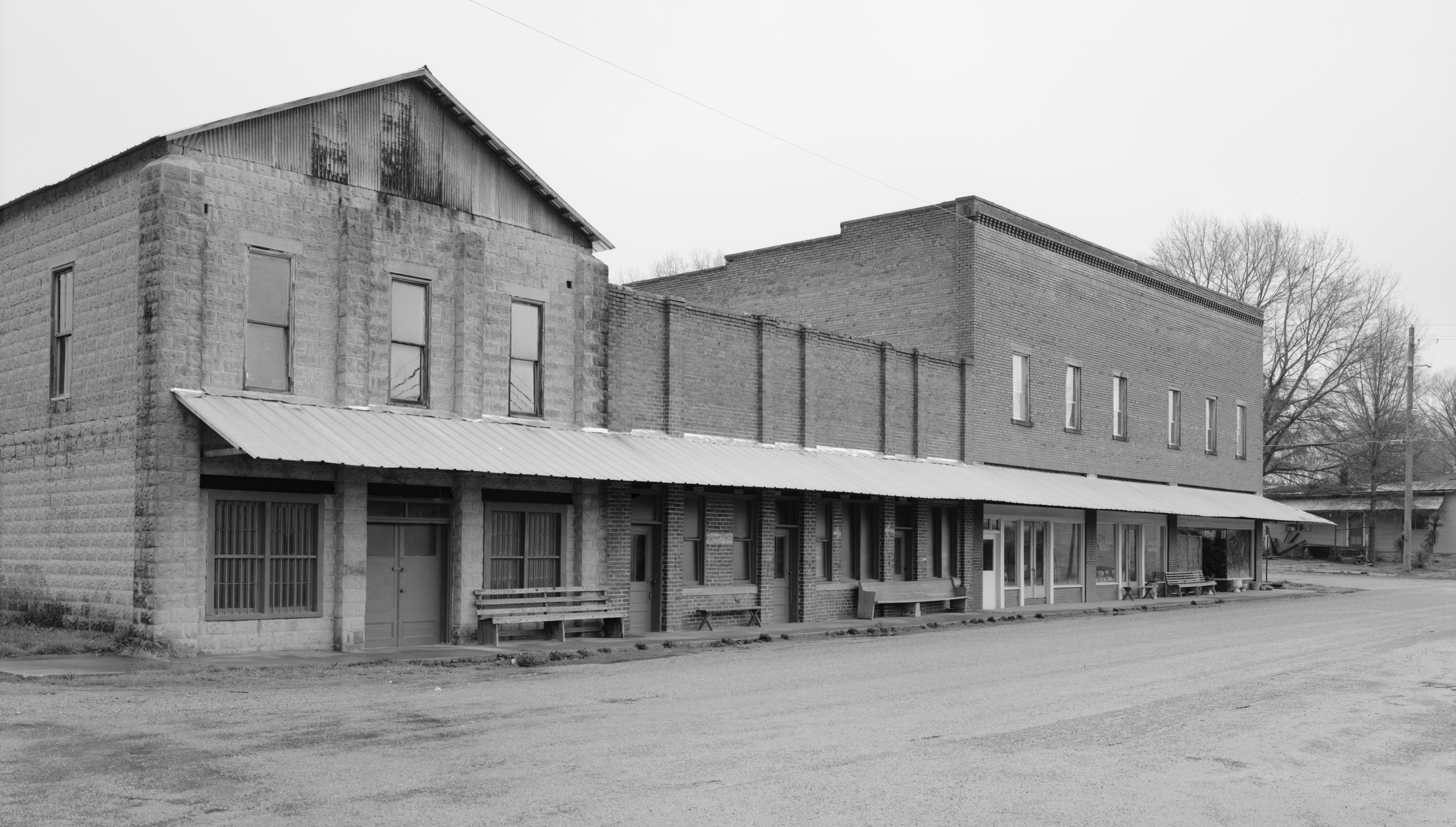
- Nauvoo Commercial Block, taken as part of the Historic American Buildings Survey

- Location of Nauvoo in Walker County and Winston County, Alabama.
- Coordinates: 33°59′15″N 87°29′15″W
- Country: United States
- State: Alabama
- Counties: Walker, Winston

Area
  - Total: 0.99 sq mi (2.57 km^{2})
  - Land: 0.99 sq mi (2.56 km^{2})
  - Water: 0.0039 sq mi (0.01 km^{2})
- Elevation: 558 ft (170 m)

Population (2020)
  - Total: 185
  - Density: 187/sq mi (72.2/km^{2})
- Time zone: UTC-6 (Central (CST))
  - Summer (DST): UTC-5 (CDT)
- ZIP code: 35578
- Area codes: 205, 659
- FIPS code: 01-53400
- GNIS feature ID: 2406967
- Website: nauvooal.gov

Nauvoo is a town on the northwestern edge of Walker County, Alabama, United States, that extends slightly north into southwestern Winston. As of the 2020 census, Nauvoo had a population of 185. Camp McDowell, the official camp and conference center of the Episcopal Diocese of Alabama, is located here.

== History ==
The town of Nauvoo was founded in 1888, during the construction of the Northern Alabama Railway, and was formerly a center of coal mining. The town grew out of isolated agricultural settlements on the Walker County-Winston County line, which had been known unofficially as Blackwell's Crossing and Ingle Mills (or Ingle's Mill) after prominent local landowners. Railroad construction drove the development of the town center on Joshua Blackwell's property, but he declined to have the new town be named officially in his honor. The local resident Tom Carroll suggested the name "Nauvoo," after Nauvoo, Illinois — a city founded by Mormon prophet Joseph Smith in 1839 and later the site of an Icarian colony settlement — reportedly "because he had admired the [Illinois] town... in his earlier travels through that state." By 1891, the town was mentioned in the Winston Herald as "Nauvoo, a flourishing town with three stores and one steam gin doing good business." Nauvoo incorporated in 1906.

Old building in Nauvoo

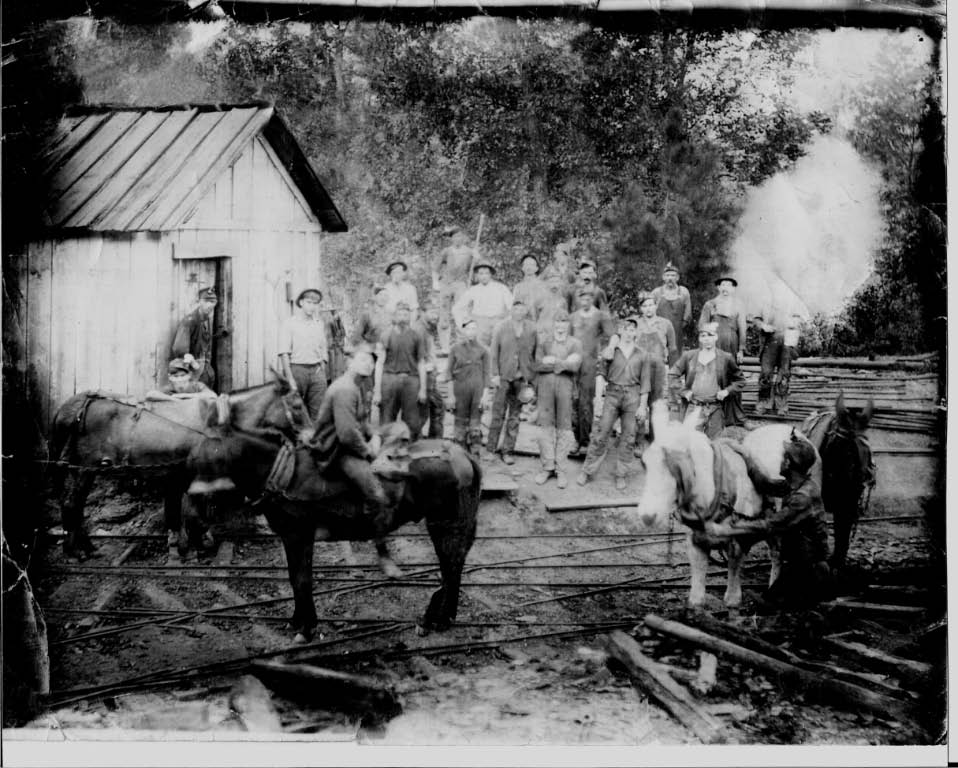
Coal mine in Nauvoo Alabama

== Demographics ==
Historical population
| Census | Pop. | Note | %± |
|---|---|---|---|
| 1910 | 392 | | — |
| 1920 | 489 | | 24.7% |
| 1930 | 648 | | 32.5% |
| 1940 | 533 | | −17.7% |
| 1950 | 416 | | −22.0% |
| 1960 | 318 | | −23.6% |
| 1970 | 265 | | −16.7% |
| 1980 | 259 | | −2.3% |
| 1990 | 240 | | −7.3% |
| 2000 | 284 | | 18.3% |
| 2010 | 221 | | −22.2% |
| 2020 | 185 | | −16.3% |
U.S. Decennial Census; 2013 Estimate

As of the census of 2000, there were 284 people, 116 households, and 83 families residing in the town. The population density was 289.3 inhabitants per square mile (111.7/km^{2}). There were 150 housing units at an average density of 152.8 per square mile (59.0/km^{2}). The racial makeup of the town was 98.24% White, 1.06% from other races, and 0.70% from two or more races. 1.76% of the population were Hispanic or Latino of any race.

There were 116 households, out of which 30.2% had children under the age of 18 living with them, 60.3% were married couples living together, 9.5% had a female householder with no husband present, and 27.6% were non-families. 27.6% of all households were made up of individuals, and 13.8% had someone living alone who was 65 years of age or older. The average household size was 2.45 and the average family size was 2.93.

In the town, the population was spread out, with 24.6% under the age of 18, 7.4% from 18 to 24, 28.2% from 25 to 44, 22.9% from 45 to 64, and 16.9% who were 65 years of age or older. The median age was 36 years. For every 100 females, there were 89.3 males. For every 100 females age 18 and over, there were 81.4 males.

The median income for a household in the town was $22,274, and the median income for a family was $29,167. Males had a median income of $24,375 versus $16,875 for females. The per capita income for the town was $11,066. About 20.7% of families and 24.4% of the population were below the poverty line, including 35.1% of those under the age of eighteen and 22.2% of those 65 or over.

== Notable people ==
- Pat Buttram (1915-1994), Hollywood actor with Gene Autry, lived part of his childhood and youth in Nauvoo
- Ben Sankey, shortstop for the Pittsburgh Pirates from 1929 to 1931, was born in Nauvoo in 1907.

== See also ==
- List of cities and towns in Alabama
