= Choctaw County, Alabama =

County in Alabama, United States

- County
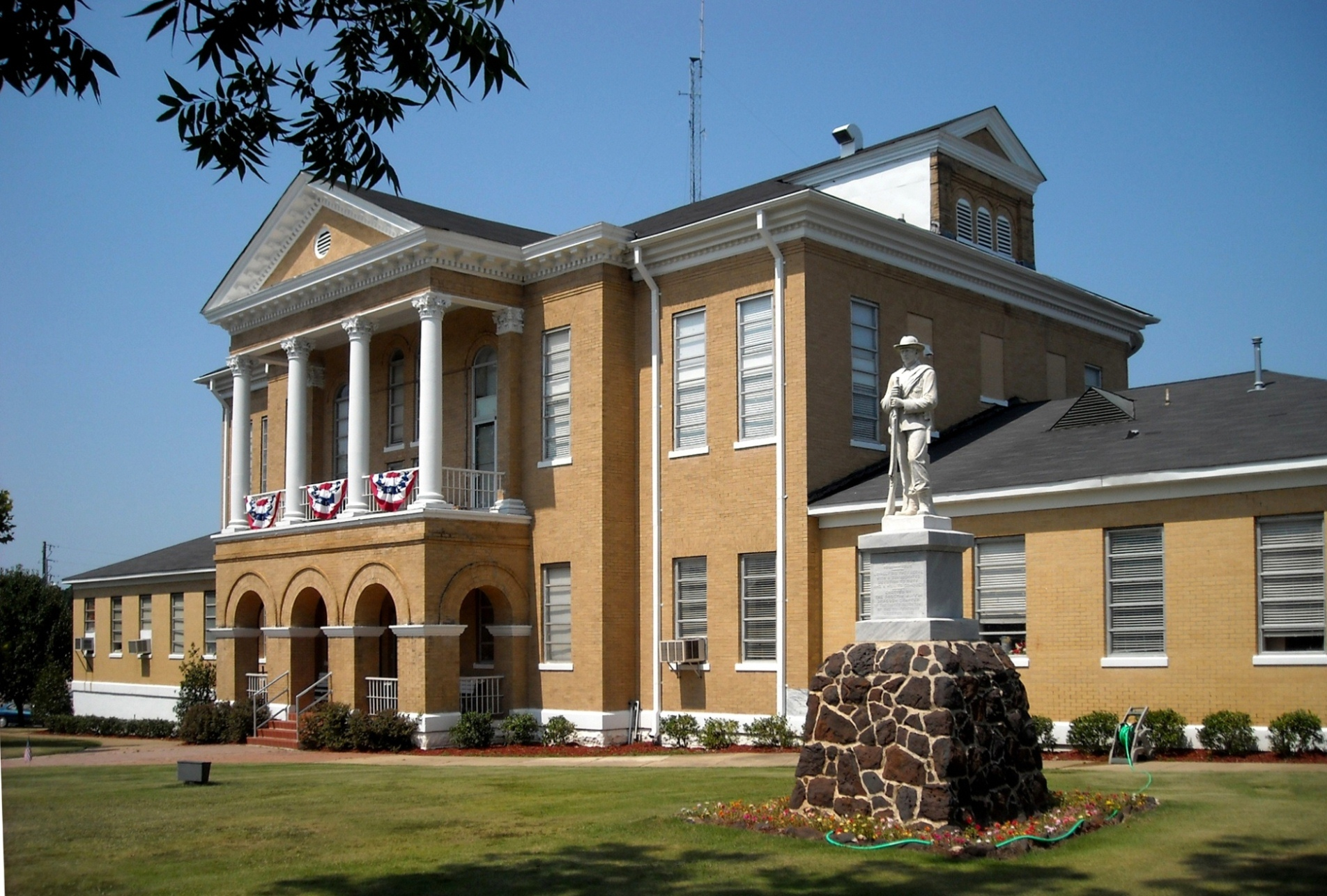
- Choctaw County Courthouse and Confederate monument in Butler

- Logo

- Location within the U.S. state of Alabama
- Coordinates: 32°01′13″N 88°15′47″W
- Country: United States
- State: Alabama
- Founded: December 29, 1847
- Named for: Choctaw tribe
- Seat: Butler
- Largest town: Butler

Area
  - Total: 921 sq mi (2,390 km^{2})
  - Land: 914 sq mi (2,370 km^{2})
  - Water: 7.4 sq mi (19 km^{2}) 0.8%

Population (2020)
  - Total: 12,665
  - Estimate (2025): 11,904 ▼
  - Density: 13.9/sq mi (5.35/km^{2})
- Time zone: UTC−6 (Central)
  - Summer (DST): UTC−5 (CDT)
- Congressional district: 7th
- Website: www.choctawcountyal.org
- County Number 15 on Alabama Licence Plates

Choctaw County is a county located in the southwestern portion of the U.S. state of Alabama. As of the 2020 census, the population was 12,665. The county seat is Butler. The county was established on December 29, 1847, and named for the Choctaw tribe of Native Americans.

== History ==
Choctaw County was originally part of the Choctaw Nation, with Choctaw settlements known to be in the vicinity of Pushmataha prior to the removal of Native Americans from the southeastern United States during the Trail of Tears.

Most of the early European American pioneers of Choctaw County were farmers from North and South Carolina. In 1912 the Alabama, Tennessee and Northern Railroad was completed through the county from north to south, connecting the area to the Port of Mobile and northern Alabama. It induced a population shift from areas near the Tombigbee River to the central part of the county.

The county's population reached its peak in the 1920s, due in part from jobs created by a sawmill boom with companies as the E. E. Jackson Lumber Company and Choctaw Lumber Company. The sawmill industry collapsed during the Great Depression. The first successful oil well in Alabama was drilled at Gilbertown in 1944, with oil and gas becoming the county's most important industry. This industry waned by the 1970s as the wells lost profitability.

An African-American family, the Thorntons of Mobile, was featured in the September 24, 1956, issue of Life. The article included an interview with the Thorntons' daughter, Allie Lee Causey, of Shady Grove in Choctaw County. In the article, Mrs. Causey, a schoolteacher, spoke openly about her family's life, stating that "integration is the only way in which Negroes will receive justice. We cannot get it as a separate people. If we can get justice on our jobs, and equal pay, then we'll be able to afford better homes and good education." When the magazine was seen in Choctaw County, the Causeys were subjected to brutal economic retaliation by white residents, who tried to coerce Mrs. Causey into recanting her remarks. Their loans were called in, local stores refused to sell them food and gasoline, Willie Causey was cut off from his employment as a woodcutter, and Mrs. Causey was fired from her job as a teacher. The Causeys left Shady Grove and Alabama for good in October 1956.

Apparel factories opened during the 1950s–60s in Silas, Toxey, and Butler, although the plants had largely closed by the 21st century. The 1950s also saw the building a paper mill at Naheola, now owned and operated by Georgia-Pacific. The county was declared a disaster area in September 1979, due to damage from Hurricane Frederic. The 1980s saw the main railroad close and the tracks removed.

=== Historic sites ===
Choctaw County has one site listed on the National Register of Historic Places, the Mount Sterling Methodist Church. Additionally, five sites are listed on the Alabama Register of Landmarks and Heritage.

== Geography ==
According to the United States Census Bureau, the county has a total area of 921 square miles (2,390 km^{2}), of which 914 square miles (2,370 km^{2}) is land and 7.4 square miles (19 km^{2}) (0.8%) is water.

=== Major highways ===
- U.S. Highway 84 / State Route 12 (unsigned)
- State Route 10
- State Route 17
- State Route 114
- State Route 156

=== Adjacent counties ===
- Sumter County (north)
- Marengo County (northeast)
- Clarke County (southeast)
- Washington County (south)
- Wayne County, Mississippi (southwest)
- Clarke County, Mississippi (west)
- Lauderdale County, Mississippi (northwest)

=== National protected area ===
- Choctaw National Wildlife Refuge

== Demographics ==
Historical population
Census	Pop.	Note	%±
1850	8,389		—
1860	13,877		65.4%
1870	12,676		−8.7%
1880	15,731		24.1%
1890	17,526		11.4%
1900	18,136		3.5%
1910	18,483		1.9%
1920	20,753		12.3%
1930	20,513		−1.2%
1940	20,195		−1.6%
1950	19,152		−5.2%
1960	17,870		−6.7%
1970	16,589		−7.2%
1980	16,839		1.5%
1990	16,018		−4.9%
2000	15,922		−0.6%
2010	13,859		−13.0%
2020	12,665		−8.6%
2025 (est.)	11,904	▼	−6.0%
U.S. Decennial Census; 1790–1960 1900–1990; 1990–2000 2010–2020

=== 2020 Census ===
Choctaw County, Alabama – Racial and ethnic composition Note: the US Census treats Hispanic/Latino as an ethnic category. This table excludes Latinos from the racial categories and assigns them to a separate category. Hispanics/Latinos may be of any race.
Race / Ethnicity (NH = Non-Hispanic)	Pop 2000	Pop 2010	Pop 2020	% 2000	% 2010	% 2020
White alone (NH)	8,724	7,700	7,039	54.79%	55.56%	55.58%
Black or African American alone (NH)	6,985	5,990	5,217	43.87%	43.22%	41.19%
Native American or Alaska Native alone (NH)	24	18	24	0.15%	0.13%	0.19%
Asian alone (NH)	6	12	19	0.04%	0.09%	0.15%
Pacific Islander alone (NH)	0	0	0	0.00%	0.00%	0.00%
Other race alone (NH)	15	10	13	0.09%	0.07%	0.10%
Mixed race or Multiracial (NH)	61	56	240	0.38%	0.40%	1.89%
Hispanic or Latino (any race)	107	73	113	0.67%	0.53%	0.89%
Total	15,922	13,859	12,665	100.00%	100.00%	100.00%

As of the 2020 census, the county had a population of 12,665. The median age was 47.6 years. 19.7% of residents were under the age of 18 and 22.9% of residents were 65 years of age or older. For every 100 females there were 93.3 males, and for every 100 females age 18 and over there were 89.5 males age 18 and over.

The racial makeup of the county was 55.9% White, 41.3% Black or African American, 0.2% American Indian and Alaska Native, 0.2% Asian, 0.0% Native Hawaiian and Pacific Islander, 0.4% from some other race, and 2.1% from two or more races. Hispanic or Latino residents of any race comprised 0.9% of the population.

0.0% of residents lived in urban areas, while 100.0% lived in rural areas.

There were 5,675 households in the county, of which 24.5% had children under the age of 18 living with them and 33.8% had a female householder with no spouse or partner present. About 35.7% of all households were made up of individuals and 16.4% had someone living alone who was 65 years of age or older.

There were 7,104 housing units, of which 20.1% were vacant. Among occupied housing units, 81.2% were owner-occupied and 18.8% were renter-occupied. The homeowner vacancy rate was 1.2% and the rental vacancy rate was 10.4%.

=== 2010 census ===
As of the 2010 United States census, there were 13,859 people living in the county. 55.8% were White, 43.4% Black or African American, 0.1% Native American, 0.1% Asian, 0.2% of some other race and 0.4% of two or more races. 0.5% were Hispanic or Latino (of any race).

=== 2000 census ===
As of the census of 2000, there were 15,922 people, 6,363 households, and 4,574 families living in the county. The population density was 17 people per square mile (6.6 people/km^{2}). There were 7,839 housing units at an average density of 9 units per square mile (3.5 units/km^{2}). The racial makeup of the county was 55.14% White, 44.13% Black or African American, 0.16% Native American, 0.04% Asian, 0.11% from other races, and 0.42% from two or more races. 0.67% of the population were Hispanic or Latino of any race.

There were 6,363 households, out of which 32.50% had children under the age of 18 living with them, 52.00% were married couples living together, 16.00% had a female householder with no husband present, and 28.10% were non-families. 26.50% of all households were made up of individuals, and 11.60% had someone living alone who was 65 years of age or older. The average household size was 2.48 and the average family size was 2.99.

In the county, the population was spread out, with 26.10% under the age of 18, 7.90% from 18 to 24, 26.20% from 25 to 44, 25.20% from 45 to 64, and 14.60% who were 65 years of age or older. The median age was 38 years. For every 100 females there were 88.80 males. For every 100 females age 18 and over, there were 85.40 males.

The median income for a household in the county was $24,749, and the median income for a family was $31,870. Males had a median income of $32,316 versus $18,760 for females. The per capita income for the county was $14,635. About 20.70% of families and 24.50% of the population were below the poverty line, including 34.80% of those under age 18 and 26.10% of those age 65 or over.

== Education ==
Choctaw County contains one public school district. There are approximately 1,100 students in public PK–12 schools in Choctaw County.

=== Districts ===
School districts include:

- Choctaw County School District

== Government ==
Choctaw County leans Republican at the presidential level. The last Democrat to win the county in a presidential election is Al Gore, who won it by a slim majority in 2000.

United States presidential election results for Choctaw County, Alabama
Year	Republican		Democratic		Third party(ies)	
Year	No.	%	No.	%	No.	%
1904	45	7.14%	558	88.57%	27	4.29%
1908	44	6.66%	590	89.26%	27	4.08%
1912	7	1.24%	489	86.40%	70	12.37%
1916	21	2.63%	765	95.63%	14	1.75%
1920	82	7.09%	1,071	92.65%	3	0.26%
1924	19	1.82%	1,021	97.80%	4	0.38%
1928	429	25.67%	1,242	74.33%	0	0.00%
1932	48	3.03%	1,533	96.90%	1	0.06%
1936	74	4.68%	1,507	95.32%	0	0.00%
1940	73	3.48%	2,023	96.52%	0	0.00%
1944	86	6.46%	1,243	93.32%	3	0.23%
1948	16	1.10%	0	0.00%	1,441	98.90%
1952	593	27.14%	1,583	72.45%	9	0.41%
1956	457	25.69%	1,250	70.26%	72	4.05%
1960	612	34.04%	1,094	60.85%	92	5.12%
1964	2,497	85.81%	0	0.00%	413	14.19%
1968	176	2.89%	1,641	26.93%	4,276	70.18%
1972	3,055	60.74%	1,934	38.45%	41	0.82%
1976	3,033	43.50%	3,911	56.10%	28	0.40%
1980	2,859	43.45%	3,680	55.93%	41	0.62%
1984	3,960	53.88%	3,373	45.90%	16	0.22%
1988	3,629	50.89%	3,491	48.96%	11	0.15%
1992	3,069	40.60%	3,941	52.13%	550	7.28%
1996	2,623	36.78%	4,074	57.13%	434	6.09%
2000	3,600	48.82%	3,707	50.27%	67	0.91%
2004	3,897	53.92%	3,303	45.70%	27	0.37%
2008	4,223	53.50%	3,636	46.06%	35	0.44%
2012	4,152	52.06%	3,786	47.47%	38	0.48%
2016	4,106	56.31%	3,109	42.64%	77	1.06%
2020	4,296	57.56%	3,127	41.89%	41	0.55%
2024	4,103	61.64%	2,515	37.79%	38	0.57%

United States Senate election results for Choctaw County, Alabama2
Year	Republican		Democratic		Third party(ies)	
Year	No.	%	No.	%	No.	%
2020	4,188	56.47%	3,225	43.49%	3	0.04%

United States Senate election results for Choctaw County, Alabama3
Year	Republican		Democratic		Third party(ies)	
Year	No.	%	No.	%	No.	%
2022	3,198	62.05%	1,899	36.85%	57	1.11%

Alabama Gubernatorial election results for Choctaw County
Year	Republican		Democratic		Third party(ies)	
Year	No.	%	No.	%	No.	%
2022	3,300	62.91%	1,841	35.09%	105	2.00%

== Communities ==
=== Towns ===
- Butler (county seat)
- Gilbertown
- Lisman
- Needham
- Pennington
- Silas
- Toxey

=== Census-designated place ===
- Cullomburg (partly in Washington County)

=== Unincorporated communities ===
- Barrytown
- Bladon Springs
- Cromwell
- Edna
- Jachin
- Melvin
- Mount Sterling
- Pushmataha
- Riderwood
- Robjohn
- Spring Hill
- Yantley

== See also ==
- National Register of Historic Places listings in Choctaw County, Alabama
- Properties on the Alabama Register of Landmarks and Heritage in Choctaw County, Alabama
