= Pennington, Alabama =

- Town
- Location of Pennington in Choctaw County, Alabama.
- Coordinates: 32°12′04″N 88°02′16″W
- Country: United States
- State: Alabama
- County: Choctaw

Area
  - Total: 5.26 sq mi (13.62 km^{2})
  - Land: 5.22 sq mi (13.51 km^{2})
  - Water: 0.042 sq mi (0.11 km^{2})
- Elevation: 79 ft (24 m)

Population (2020)
  - Total: 329
  - Density: 63.1/sq mi (24.35/km^{2})
- Time zone: UTC-6 (Central (CST))
  - Summer (DST): UTC-5 (CDT)
- ZIP code: 36916
- Area codes: 205, 659
- FIPS code: 01-58968
- GNIS feature ID: 2407098
- Website: https://townofpenningtonalabama.com/home/

Pennington is a town in Choctaw County, Alabama, United States. As of the 2020 census, Pennington had a population of 329.

== Geography ==
Pennington is located in northeastern Choctaw County.

According to the U.S. Census Bureau, the town has a total area of 2.0 square miles (5.1 km^{2}), all land.

== Demographics ==
Historical population
Census	Pop.	Note	%±
1970	301		—
1980	355		17.9%
1990	302		−14.9%
2000	353		16.9%
2010	221		−37.4%
2020	329		48.9%
U.S. Decennial Census; 2013 Estimate

As of the census of 2000, there were 353 people, 142 households, and 103 families residing in the town. The population density was 188.6 inhabitants per square mile (72.8/km^{2}). There were 197 housing units at an average density of 105.3 per square mile (40.7/km^{2}). The racial makeup of the town was 64.31% White, 34.84% Black or African American, 0.28% Native American, 0.57% from other races.

There were 142 households, out of which 35.9% had children under the age of 18 living with them, 54.2% were married couples living together, 15.5% had a female householder with no husband present, and 26.8% were non-families. 26.8% of all households were made up of individuals, and 9.2% had someone living alone who was 65 years of age or older. The average household size was 2.49 and the average family size was 2.98.

In the town, the population was spread out, with 28.6% under the age of 18, 6.5% from 18 to 24, 28.6% from 25 to 44, 22.7% from 45 to 64, and 13.6% who were 65 years of age or older. The median age was 38 years. For every 100 females, there were 98.3 males. For every 100 females age 18 and over, there were 101.6 males.

The median income for a household in the town was $32,917, and the median income for a family was $44,375. Males had a median income of $33,438 versus $16,250 for females. The per capita income for the town was $14,022. About 13.7% of families and 20.9% of the population were below the poverty line, including 21.8% of those under age 18 and 10.8% of those age 65 or over.

== Folklore ==
The town is closely associated with the Eliza Battle disaster on the Tombigbee River and its associated folklore.

== Notable person ==
- Billie Young, actor, activist, poet and educator
