= DeBardeleben =

DeBardeleben may refer to:

- Henry F. DeBardeleben (1840–1910), American coal magnate
- Henry T. DeBardeleben (1874–1948), American coal magnate
- Joan DeBardeleben, political scientist
- Margaret DeBardeleben Tutwiler (born 1950), American diplomat
- Mike DeBardeleben (1940–2011), American rapist and possible serial killer
