= Elbert Allen Drummond =

American lawyer

- Born: August 3, 1943; Birmingham, Alabama, U.S.
- Died: July 30, 2012 (aged 68); Jasper, Alabama, U.S.
- Education: University of Alabama
- Occupation: Businessman
- Known for: Vice Chairman of Drummond Company
- Spouse: Abbie Kiker
- Children: 3
- Parent(s): Heman Edward Drummond; Elza Eliza Stewart
- Relatives: Garry N. Drummond (brother)

Elbert Allen Drummond (a.k.a. E.A. Drummond or Larry Drummond) (August 3, 1943 – July 30, 2012) was an American heir, businessman and philanthropist from Alabama. He served as the vice chairman of the Drummond Company, a large private coal corporation active in Alabama and Colombia.

== Early life ==
Elbert Allen Drummond was born on August 3, 1943, in Birmingham, Alabama. His father, Heman Edward Drummond, founded the Drummond Company, a coal-mining company active in Alabama and Colombia, in 1935.

He was educated at the Sipsey School and the Walker County High School in Jasper, where he played on the football and baseball teams. He attended Walker College for two years. He then attended Samford University, but transferred to the University of Alabama in Tuscaloosa, where he joined the Beta Alpha Psi fraternity. He graduated with a bachelor's degree in Commerce and Business Administration in 1965. He went on to receive a master's degree in Accounting from UA in 1966 and a Juris Doctor in 1969 from the University of Alabama School of Law. He joined the American Bar Association and the Alabama Bar Association.

== Career ==
Drummond joined the family business, the Drummond Company. He later served as its vice chairman as well as the chairman of its executive committee. Under his leadership, he helped foster business ties with Japanese companies.

During 1979-1980, Drummond, together with his brother, Garry, and company executive Clyde Black, was indicted for bribing three Alabama legislators, by means of supplying them with prostitutes. The trial lasted three months, but it was dismissed by Judge Frank McFadden; the record is now sealed.

Drummond served on the board of directors of the First Commercial Bank.

Drummond was inducted into the Alabama Business Hall of Fame and the Alabama Academy of Honor in 2011.

== Philanthropy and political activity ==
Drummond served on the board of directors of the Black Warrior Council of the Boy Scouts of America and United Way of Central Alabama’s Le Societe National. He served on the Boards of Visitors of the Culverhouse College of Commerce and the University of Alabama President’s Cabinet. Additionally, he served on the board of trustees of the Walker Area Community Foundation and the Alabama Conservation and Natural Resources Foundation.

Drummond was a significant donor to the Republican National Committee, the National Republican Congressional Committee, and the Alabama Republican Party. He also donated to the campaigns of Republican politicians Bill McCollum, Richard Shelby, Jennifer Dunn, Terry Everett, Robert Aderholt, Mike Rogers, Katherine Harris, and Johnny Isakson, as well as to the 2004 re-election of President George W. Bush. He also donated US$51,750 to Bob Riley's gubernatorial campaign. Critics suggested this latter donation may explain why he was able to acquire land sold from the former Farquhar Cattle Ranch, even though Drummond denied any wrongdoing.

He served on the board of directors of the American Family Business Institute. He testified before the United States Senate Committee on Finance about the estate tax on November 14, 2007.

== Personal life ==
He married Abbie Kiker, his high school sweetheart, at the age of nineteen. They had two sons, Scott A. Drummond and Patrick L. Drummond, and a daughter, Terri Drummond Lyon.

== Death and legacy ==
He died on July 30, 2012, at the age of sixty-eight. His funeral took place at the First Baptist Church in Jasper, Alabama. He was buried at the Pisgah Baptist Church and Cemetery in Sipsey, Alabama.

In 2012, a US$50,000 scholarship was named in his honor at his alma mater, the University of Alabama, as a result of a fundraising one-shot turkey hunt held by the Alabama Conservation and Natural Resources Foundation.
