= Stephen Yale-Loehr =

American law professor and lawyer

- Born: Virginia, United States

Academic background
- Education: Cornell Law School

Academic work
- Discipline: Immigration law, Refugee law
- Institutions: Cornell Law School

Stephen W. Yale-Loehr (born June 10, 1954) is an American immigration law scholar, lawyer, author, and retired professor of immigration law practice at Cornell Law School. A specialist in United States immigration and asylum law, he is known for his work on employment-based immigration, immigrant investor programs, asylum and refugee protection, immigration courts, and the procedural rights of noncitizens. He was a member of the Cornell Law School faculty from 1991 until his retirement in December 2024.

Yale-Loehr was a longtime co-author and editor of Immigration Law and Procedure, a multivolume treatise on United States immigration law that has been cited hundreds of times by federal courts, including the Supreme Court of the United States. He also founded Cornell Law School's Immigration Law and Policy Program, co-directed its Asylum and Convention Against Torture Appellate Clinic, and founded and served as the first executive director of Invest in the USA (IIUSA), a trade association associated with the EB-5 immigrant investor regional center industry.

In addition to his academic work, Yale-Loehr practiced immigration law for more than 35 years, principally as of counsel at Miller Mayer in Ithaca, New York. He has testified before the United States Congress on immigration policy and has served as an expert on United States immigration law in litigation in the United States and Canada. In 2024, the American Immigration Lawyers Association awarded him its Robert E. Juceam Founders Award for his impact on immigration law and policy.

== Early life ==
Yale-Loehr was born in Virginia and grew up in Kansas. He moved to Ithaca, New York, at the age of fifteen and attended Ithaca High School. After high school, he spent a year in Japan as an exchange student.

He attended Cornell University, where his academic interests included archaeology, Japanese, and photography. He received a Bachelor of Arts degree in 1977. After graduation, during a period of economic recession, he worked as a hotel bellhop in Syracuse for a year before enrolling at Cornell Law School.

At Cornell Law, Yale-Loehr developed an interest in international legal affairs and served as editor-in-chief of the Cornell International Law Journal. He received his Juris Doctor, cum laude, in 1981.

== Career ==
=== Early legal career ===
After law school, Yale-Loehr served for one year as a law clerk to Chief Judge Howard G. Munson of the United States District Court for the Northern District of New York. He subsequently joined a large law firm in Washington, D.C., where he initially practiced international trade law, including international antitrust and antidumping matters.

He gradually developed an immigration practice and learned the field with assistance from practitioners in the Washington, D.C. immigration bar.

During this period, he also taught immigration law as an adjunct professor at Georgetown University Law Center for two years.

In 1990, Yale-Loehr returned to Ithaca and established an immigration practice at Miller Mayer. He later served as of counsel in the firm's immigration practice group, advising corporations and individuals on employment- and family-based immigration matters. His practice included business visas, investor immigration, immigration compliance, and other areas of federal immigration law. in Ithaca, New York.

=== Cornell Law School ===
Yale-Loehr joined the Cornell Law School faculty as an adjunct professor in 1991 and introduced the school's first course devoted to immigration law. He later became a full-time member of the faculty and professor of immigration law practice.

At Cornell, his teaching encompassed ,immigration law asylum law, and clinical immigration practice. He founded the Law School's Immigration Law and Policy Program and served as its faculty director. The program developed research and policy projects addressing immigration adjudication, labor migration, humanitarian protection, and reform of the United States immigration system.

In 2003, Yale-Loehr and clinical professor Estelle M. McKee co-founded Cornell's Asylum and Convention Against Torture Appellate Clinic. The clinic represented noncitizens appealing denials of asylum and protection under the Convention Against Torture. Yale-Loehr co-directed the clinic and supervised law students in cases before the Board of Immigration Appeals and federal courts.

Yale-Loehr also helped establish Cornell's Afghanistan Assistance Clinic and helped develop Path2Papers, an initiative designed to provide consultations to recipients of Deferred Action for Childhood Arrivals seeking possible pathways to permanent immigration status. He was also a faculty fellow of the Cornell Migrations Initiative, where he participated in interdisciplinary migration research.

He retired from Cornell Law School in December 2024 after more than three decades on the faculty. Cornell Law marked his retirement with a symposium in November 2024 examining immigration, the economy, and changes in legal representation.

=== Immigration law scholarship ===
Yale-Loehr's scholarship has focused on the structure and administration of United States immigration law. His work spans business immigration, skilled migration, immigrant investor programs, asylum, immigration adjudication, national security, and the constitutional rights of noncitizens.

=== Immigration law doctrine and legal reference works ===
Yale-Loehr was a longtime co-author and editor of Immigration Law and Procedure, a continuously revised multivolume treatise published by LexisNexis. The work grew to twenty-two volumes and became a major reference source for immigration lawyers, judges, and scholars.

His work on the treatise involved the analysis of immigration statutes, regulations, administrative decisions, and federal case law. The publication's continuing revision reflected the frequent statutory and administrative changes characteristic of United States immigration law.

Yale-Loehr also co-authored Immigration and Nationality Law: Problems and Strategies with Lenni B. Benson and Shoba Sivaprasad Wadhia. The casebook approaches immigration law through legal problems and strategic decision-making and has been used in law school immigration courses.

Earlier in his career, Yale-Loehr wrote or co-authored reference works explaining major federal immigration legislation, including Understanding the 1986 Immigration Law and Understanding the Immigration Act of 1990.

=== Immigration system reform ===
A recurring theme of Yale-Loehr's work has been the fragmentation and procedural complexity of the United States immigration system. He has argued that immigration policy is divided among multiple federal agencies with overlapping or inconsistent responsibilities and that prolonged adjudication adversely affects employers, families, and asylum seekers.

His research has also examined the effects of congressional inaction on immigration policymaking. Yale-Loehr has argued that the absence of comprehensive legislative reform has shifted increasing responsibility to executive agencies and federal courts, producing frequent litigation over administrative immigration policies.

In 2016, he and Muzaffar Chishti published The Immigration Act of 1990: Unfinished Business a Quarter-Century Later for the Migration Policy Institute. The study examined the long-term consequences of the Immigration Act of 1990 and identified areas in which the employment-based and broader legal immigration systems have failed to adapt to demographic and economic change.

In 2023, Yale-Loehr co-authored At the Breaking Point: Rethinking the U.S. Immigration Court System with Muzaffar Chishti, Doris Meissner, Kathleen Bush-Joseph, and Christopher Levesque. The Migration Policy Institute report examined the growth of the immigration court backlog and structural weaknesses in the Executive Office for Immigration Review. The authors evaluated proposals for institutional and administrative reform of the immigration adjudication system.

=== Skilled and employment-based immigration ===
Yale-Loehr has written extensively on skilled migration and employment-based immigration. With Demetrios G. Papademetriou, he co-authored Balancing Interests: Rethinking U.S. Selection of Skilled Immigrants, published by the Carnegie Endowment for International Peace in 1996. The work considered methods of balancing labor-market needs, employer demand, and national immigration policy in the selection of skilled immigrants.

In later research, Yale-Loehr examined the potential use of points-based immigration systems. With Mackenzie Eason, he developed a proposal for a points-tested visa program designed to complement rather than entirely replace employer- and family-based immigration categories. Their work considered how education, occupational skills, age, and other factors might be incorporated into immigrant selection.

His employment-based immigration scholarship has also addressed H-1B specialty occupation visas, L-1 intracompany transferee visas, employer sanctions, work authorization verification, and delays in the employment-based green card system.

EB-5 immigrant investor program

Yale-Loehr developed a particular specialization in the EB-5 immigrant investor program. The program permits qualifying foreign investors to seek permanent residence through investments associated with job creation in the United States.

He founded and served as the first executive director of Invest in the USA, commonly known as IIUSA, a trade association of EB-5 regional centers. He also served for more than a decade as chair, co-chair, or a member of immigration law committees concerned with EB-5 practice.

Yale-Loehr's work on EB-5 examined the relationship between immigration law and corporate, securities, investment, and economic-development issues. He described the category as one of the most legally complex areas of business immigration practice.

He testified before the Senate Judiciary Committee in 2009 during a hearing assessing the EB-5 regional center program. In his testimony and professional writing, Yale-Loehr discussed the program as an economic-development mechanism while also addressing the need for regulatory oversight and consistent adjudication.

Asylum and the rights of noncitizens

Yale-Loehr's asylum scholarship and clinical work have examined access to counsel, procedural fairness, detention, credibility determinations, and judicial review. With John R. Mills and Kristen M. Echemendia, he examined whether due process principles should require appointed counsel for indigent noncitizens in cases in which removal could expose an applicant to persecution, torture, or death. The work analogized the heightened procedural protections in death penalty cases to asylum and Convention Against Torture proceedings.

His clinical work at Cornell focused on appeals by asylum applicants who had been denied protection at the administrative level. Yale-Loehr criticized the difficulties faced by applicants attempting to establish complex persecution claims without legal representation and the use of minor testimonial inconsistencies in adverse credibility findings.

In a later area of scholarship, Yale-Loehr examined the intersection of criminal and immigration law, often described as "crimmigration." In a 2025 article co-authored with Josh A. Roth, Dismantling the Due Process Dichotomy in Crimmigration Cases, he argued that certain provisions of the Immigration and Nationality Act raise constitutional concerns when applied to lawful permanent residents in cases involving immigration fraud and terrorism. The article applied the Mathews v. Eldridge balancing framework and proposed additional procedural safeguards for permanent residents.

Immigration and national security

Following the September 11, 2001, attacks, Yale-Loehr participated in research examining the relationship between immigration controls, national security, and civil liberties.

He was a co-author of America's Challenge: Domestic Security, Civil Liberties, and National Unity After September 11, published by the Migration Policy Institute in 2003. The study examined federal security policies adopted after the attacks and their implications for immigration enforcement and civil liberties.

He later co-authored Secure Borders, Open Doors: Visa Procedures in the Post-September 11 Era. The report examined visa screening and proposed approaches intended to reconcile national-security screening with travel, education, business, and international mobility.

In 2019, Yale-Loehr co-authored a Migration Policy Institute study on noncitizens in the United States military. The report examined tensions between military recruitment needs, naturalization policies, and national-security screening.

=== Digital nomads and emerging immigration issues ===
In research published in the mid-2020s, Yale-Loehr turned to immigration questions created by remote work and digital mobility. With Angelo A. Paparelli, David Bier, and Peter Choi, he co-authored Why US Immigration Officials Should Allow "Digital Nomad" Admissions. The study examined the absence of a clear United States immigration category for foreign professionals who work remotely while temporarily present in the United States. The authors argued that existing immigration statutes and policies provide insufficient guidance for digital nomads and for foreign visitors who engage in incidental remote work while in the United States. The research proposed administrative approaches to distinguishing such activity from unauthorized employment.

Congressional testimony and public policy work

Yale-Loehr has testified multiple times before committees and subcommittees of the United States Congress on immigration law and policy.

In congressional testimony, he has addressed the L-1 intracompany transferee visa category, employment eligibility verification, employer sanctions, and the EB-5 regional center program. During a 2003 Senate hearing concerning L-1 visas, he provided an overview of the visa category and discussed the balance between preventing abuse and preserving legitimate intracompany transfers.

In 2007, he testified before a House Judiciary subcommittee concerning problems in the employment verification and worksite enforcement system. His testimony reviewed the history of employer sanctions since the Immigration Reform and Control Act of 1986 and identified systemic weaknesses in employment verification.

Expert witness work

Yale-Loehr has been retained as an expert on United States immigration law in federal and state litigation, arbitration proceedings, and Canadian legal matters.

For example, in Arizona Dream Act Coalition v. Brewer, Yale-Loehr submitted an expert report concerning federal immigration classifications and the legal status of recipients of Deferred Action for Childhood Arrivals (DACA). The litigation challenged Arizona's treatment of DACA recipients.

Yale-Loehr also testified as an expert on United States immigration law in a Canadian criminal trial and participated as an expert in the Canadian commission investigating the detention and treatment of Maher Arar. The Commission of Inquiry examined the actions of Canadian officials in connection with Arar's detention in the United States and removal to Syria.

=== Notable legal representation ===
Among the immigration matters Yale-Loehr has discussed publicly was his representation of Dan-el Padilla Peralta, then a Princeton University student who had received a scholarship to study at the University of Oxford but lacked lawful immigration status in the United States.

Leaving the United States risked triggering a ten-year bar to Padilla Peralta's return. Yale-Loehr developed a waiver strategy that required an application from outside the country and coordinated advocacy by Princeton students, faculty, and alumni. The matter received national media attention. Padilla Peralta ultimately received permission to return to the United States after his studies.

=== Editorial and professional activities ===
From 1986 to 1994, Yale-Loehr held senior editorial roles with Interpreter Releases and Immigration Briefings, publications reporting and analyzing developments in United States immigration law.

For approximately ten years, he co-authored a bimonthly immigration law column for the New York Law Journal. He has also written and edited numerous professional materials on business immigration and immigration practice.

Yale-Loehr has been active in the American Immigration Lawyers Association. His service has included work on the organization's asylum, business immigration, and immigrant investor committees.

He is a Fellow of the American Bar Foundation and has served as a nonresident fellow at the Migration Policy Institute in Washington, D.C.

== Awards ==
Yale-Loehr was the 2001 recipient of the American Immigration Lawyers Association's Elmer Fried Award for excellence in teaching and the 2004 winner of the American Immigration Lawyers Association's Edith Lowenstein Award for excellence in advancing the practice of immigration law. He is a Fellow of the American Bar Foundation, a Nonresident Fellow at the Migration Policy Institute, and a founding member of the Alliance of Business Immigration Lawyers.

In 2024, AILA presented Yale-Loehr with the Robert E. Juceam Founders Award.

Yale-Loehr received the Provost Award for Teaching Excellence in Graduate and Professional Degree Programs from Cornell University in 2024.

In 2024, the Stephen Yale-Loehr Immigration Scholarship was established at Cornell Law School in recognition of his contributions to immigration law education and advocacy.

== Selectd publications ==
=== Books ===
Yale-Loehr co-authors the 22-volume treatise Immigration Law and Procedure, which is considered one of the standard reference works in the field and is often cited in the U.S. Supreme Court and other federal court case opinions. His other published books and publications include:

- Co-author, A Realistic Road to a Points-Tested Visa Program in the United States (2020)
- Co-author, Immigration And Nationality Law: Problems And Strategies (2d ed. 2019)
- Editor, Global Business Immigration Practice Guide (2012)
- S. Amrhein, A. Lindquist, L. Danielson & S. Yale-Loehr, Green Card Stories (2012)
- Co-author, Secure Borders, Open Doors: Visa Procedures In The Post-September 11 Era (2005)
- Co-author, America’s Challenge: Domestic Security, Civil Liberties, And National Unity After September 11 (2003)
- C. Gordon, S. Mailman, S. Yale-Loehr & R. Wada, Immigration Law And Procedure
- D. Papademetriou & S. Yale-Loehr, Balancing Interests: Rethinking U.S. Selection Of Skilled Immigrants (1996)
- S. Yale-Loehr, Understanding The Immigration Act Of 1990 (1991)
- M. Roberts & S. Yale-Loehr, Understanding The 1986 Immigration Law (1987)

=== Articles ===
- Yale-Loehr, Stephen W. (29 April 2018). "Employers as Junior Immigration Inspectors: The Impact of the 1986 Immigration Reform and Control Act". doi.org.
- Chishti, Muzaffar; Rose, Austin; Yale-Loehr, Stephen (1 May 2019). "Noncitizens in the U.S. Military: Navigating National Security Concerns and Recruitment Needs". Cornell Law Faculty Publications.
- Yale-Loehr, Stephen W. (29 April 2018). "Employers as Junior Immigration Inspectors: The Impact of the 1986 Immigration Reform and Control Act". doi.org.
- Lee, Hun; Yale-Loehr, Stephen (2020). "Challenging H-1B Denials in Federal Courts: Trends and Strategies". doi.org.
- Paparelli, Angelo A.; Bier, David; Choi, Peter; Yale-Loehr, Stephen (2024). "Why US Immigration Officials Should Allow "Digital Nomad" Admissions". doi.org.
- Yale-Loehr, Stephen W. (29 April 2018). "The Odyssey of the J-2: Forty-Three Years of Trying Not to Go Home Again". doi.org.
- Chishti, Muzaffar; Meissner, Doris; Yale-Loehr, Stephen; Bush-Joseph, Kathleen; and Levesque, Christopher. At the Breaking Point: Rethinking the U.S. Immigration Court System. Migration Policy Institute, 2023.
