= Shawn Jackson (public official) =

Mississippi County Supervisor

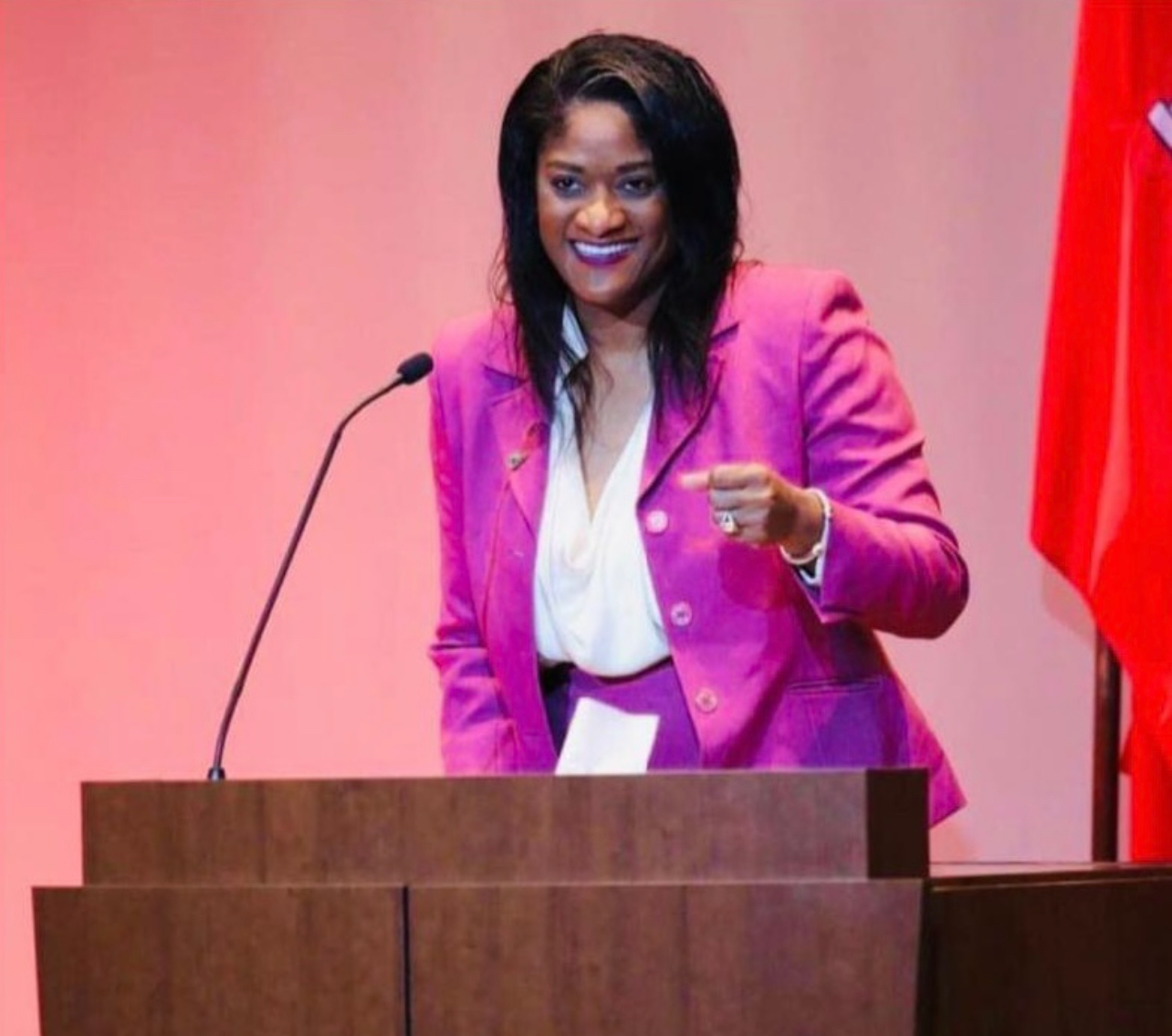
- Shawn Jackson

Warren County District 3 Supervisor
- Incumbent
- Assumed office January 2020

Personal details
- Born: Vicksburg, Mississippi, U.S.

NaShawndra Jackson-Davis, known professionally as Shawn Jackson, is an American public official, entrepreneur, and law student based in Vicksburg, Mississippi. She serves as the Warren County District 3 Supervisor, having become the first African American woman elected to the Warren County Board of Supervisors in the county's history. She is currently pursuing a Juris Doctor at Mississippi College School of Law.

== Early life and education ==
Jackson was born and raised in Vicksburg, Mississippi, in the same area that now comprises District 3, which she represents as supervisor. Her mother relocated to Ithaca, New York, and Jackson completed her secondary education at Ithaca High School, graduating a year early at the age of 17 after completing the program in three years.

She attended Cornell University's Summer College program in 1993, earning college credits while still in high school. She subsequently earned a Bachelor of Science in Industrial and Labor Relations from Cornell University in 1998, where she was a member of the Mortar Board Senior Honor Society, a Cornell Tradition Fellow, and a member of the Quill and Dagger Senior Honor Society, one of Cornell's oldest and most selective secret senior honor societies. She was also a member of the Cornell Track and Field team and the NAACP.

She is currently enrolled as a law student at Mississippi College School of Law in Jackson, Mississippi, expected to earn her Juris Doctor in May 2027. At MC Law she serves on the Law Review as a Staff Writer, is a member of the Moot Court Board, competed in the National Moot Court Competition representing Mississippi College School of Law, and is a member of the Black Law Students Association. She also serves as a Teaching Assistant for Contracts I and II. She has earned the Dean's List distinction, received the Robert and Marie Upton Scholarship, and won a Best Paper Award in Legal Research II. In 2025, she was selected by Balch & Bingham as the firm's Leadership Council on Legal Diversity (LCLD) 1L Scholar during her summer clerkship at the firm's Gulfport, Mississippi office.

== Career ==
=== Strategic consulting and corporate career (1997–2007) ===
Jackson began her professional career as a strategic consultant at The Monitor Company (now Monitor Deloitte) in New York City, where she advised major corporate clients on strategy, business development, and mergers and acquisitions. Among her clients were AT&T, Merck Pharmaceuticals, and the Government of Bermuda.

From 1999 to 2002, she served as a founding Senior Manager of Strategy and Business Development at Epik Communications, a regional telecommunications company and subsidiary of Florida East Coast Railroad based in Orlando, Florida. She helped grow the organization to more than 250 employees and structured fiber-optic network expansion agreements and telecom real estate acquisitions exceeding $500 million in value.

From 2005 to 2007, she served as a founding Vice President of Investment Management at The Integral Group in Atlanta, Georgia, where she raised, managed, and invested more than $50 million in New Markets Tax Credits (NMTC) funds.

=== TrainSpree (2011–2024) ===
In 2011, Jackson founded TrainSpree, a workforce development and consulting firm based in Vicksburg, Mississippi. Over more than a decade, the company trained more than 10,000 employees across Mississippi, Tennessee, and Louisiana, serving clients including state agencies, national service organizations such as AmeriCorps, school districts, municipalities, and private companies.

== Political career ==
=== Election to the Warren County Board of Supervisors (2019) ===
In 2019, Jackson entered the race for the Warren County Board of Supervisors District 3 seat, then held by longtime incumbent Charles Selmon. She advanced through a Democratic Party primary in August 2019, defeating Selmon in a runoff to earn the Democratic nomination. She then won the November 2019 general election, defeating Republican challenger David Sharp with 1,534 votes to Sharp's 448. Her election made her the first African American woman ever elected to the Warren County Board of Supervisors.

=== First term (2020–2023) ===
Jackson was sworn into office in January 2020 and was appointed Vice President of the Board of Supervisors, a position to which she was subsequently reappointed.

==== COVID-19 response ====
During the COVID-19 pandemic, Jackson spearheaded the county's community relief efforts. Under her leadership, Warren County distributed more than 20,000 boxes of food to residents throughout the county. She also advocated for and helped establish a drive-through vaccination site for county residents and worked to secure distributions of personal protective equipment, including masks and hand sanitizer.

==== Confederate flag removal and racial threats (2020) ====
In June 2020, following the Mississippi Legislature's vote to retire the state flag bearing Confederate imagery, Jackson called for a special meeting of the Warren County Board of Supervisors to formally remove the flag from county properties. In response to her public advocacy, a man posted a violent racial threat against her on social media. Jackson reported the threat to law enforcement, and a man was subsequently arrested by the Warren County Sheriff's Department and charged in connection with the threatening post.

==== Infrastructure and federal engagement ====
In November 2021, Jackson attended a White House press briefing on the $1.2 trillion federal infrastructure bill, joining the briefing virtually during a board work session in order to advocate for Warren County's share of the legislation's funding.

==== Redistricting and housing ====
During her first term, Jackson led efforts to address gerrymandering in Warren County's voting precincts and sponsored comprehensive housing initiatives, including advocacy for home improvement grants, housing down payment assistance programs, and the construction of new homes in historically underserved areas of the county. She also worked to ensure a transparent and inclusive process for the county's distribution of its $8.8 million in American Rescue Plan Act (ARPA) funding.

==== New Warren County Jail ====
Jackson served as the Board of Supervisors' designated lead on the new Warren County Jail construction project, a major public infrastructure undertaking intended to replace the county's existing jail facility, which had been built in 1907 and received its last significant upgrade in 1977. She oversaw contractor negotiations and the assembly and management of the project's design-build team. A groundbreaking ceremony was held on September 16, 2024, at the project's site on Old Highway 80. The facility, funded by a $74 million loan to be repaid over 30 years, is designed to house 240 inmates with capacity for future expansion.

A priority Jackson championed during the jail project negotiations was a requirement that at least 25 percent of the construction contract dollars be directed to local businesses and workers in Warren County.

=== Re-election (2023) ===
Jackson sought re-election to her District 3 seat in 2023. The Democratic primary race was closely contested, with Jackson prevailing over challenger Eros Smith with approximately 52 percent of the vote, a margin of 44 votes that prompted her opponent to consider a recount request. She went on to win the general election and begin her second term.

=== Mayoral candidacy (2021) ===
In January 2021, Jackson filed qualifying papers to run for Mayor of Vicksburg, becoming the second candidate to enter the race after incumbent Mayor George Flaggs Jr.

=== Cornell University alumni board ===
Cornell University appointed Jackson to serve on the university's board of directors for alumni affairs, a role in which she has worked to connect Warren County and Mississippi students with opportunities at Cornell.

== Legal career ==
Jackson has completed legal internships and associate positions at several Mississippi law firms while pursuing her law degree. In 2024, she worked as a legal intern and law office manager at Marshall Sanders Law Firm in Vicksburg, where she gained experience in estate law, personal injury, medical malpractice, and appellate litigation. In the summer of 2025, she held summer associate positions at three law firms: Balch & Bingham LLP in Gulfport, where she was selected as the firm's Leadership Council on Legal Diversity (LCLD) 1L Scholar; Brunini, Grantham, Grower & Hewes PLLC in Jackson; and Cosmich Simmons & Brown in Jackson.

== Professional licenses ==
Jackson holds a Mississippi real estate broker's license with an SFR (Short Sale and Foreclosure Resource) designation and is a member of the National Association of Realtors. She is also a licensed insurance broker.

== Community involvement and affiliations ==
- Board of Directors – Vicksburg Convention and Visitors Bureau
- Board of Directors – Cornell University School of Industrial and Labor Relations Alumni Association
- Vice President of Fundraising – Cornell Black Alumni Association
- Delegate – Warren County Democratic Committee
- Economic and Workforce Development Committee – National Association of County Officials

== Personal life ==
Jackson is a native of Vicksburg, Mississippi, and a lifelong member of Historic Bethel AME Church of Vicksburg. She is the mother of three sons.
