= Henry DeBardeleben =

Henry DeBardeleben may refer to:

- Henry F. DeBardeleben (1840–1910), American coal magnate and town founder from Alabama
- Henry T. DeBardeleben (1874–1948), his son, American coal magnate from Alabama
