= Sam Hill (baseball) =

American baseball player

- Outfielder
- Born: May 2, 1926; New Castle, Alabama, U.S.
- Died: April 4, 1977 (aged 50)
- Batted: Left Threw: Right

Negro league baseball debut
- 1946, for the Chicago American Giants

Last appearance
- 1948, for the Chicago American Giants
- Stats at Baseball Reference

Teams
- Chicago American Giants (1946–1948)

Samuel Hill (May 2, 1926 – April 4, 1977) was an American Negro league outfielder in the 1940s.

A native of New Castle, Alabama, Hill made his Negro leagues debut in 1946 with the Chicago American Giants. He played three seasons with Chicago, and was selected to the 1948 East–West All-Star Game. Hill went on to play minor league ball in the Mandak League from 1950 to 1952, and later played for the Williamsport Grays, Charlotte Hornets, and Duluth-Superior White Sox. He died in 1977 at age 48.
