= Milton Fies =

Jewish-American Industrialist

Milton H. Fies
- 1939 portrait
- Born: Milton Henry Fies; August 31, 1882; Birmingham, Alabama, US
- Died: October 20, 1970 (aged 88); Birmingham, Alabama, US
- Burial place: Birmingham, Alabama
- Occupation: Businessman
- Employer: Henry T. DeBardeleben
- Known for: Miner, engineer, and chemist
- Title: Dr
- Spouse: Rose Mayer
- Parent(s): Jacob Fies; Fannie (Kahn) Fies

Milton Henry Fies (August 31, 1882 – October 20, 1970) was a Jewish-American engineer, miner, chemist, and town founder from Birmingham, Alabama.

== Early life ==
Fies's father, Jacob Fies, was a German Jew who founded the Livery and Feed Stable Company in Birmingham, Alabama. Jacob Fies, who was born in Trainbach, Alsace, Germany in 1827, came to Birmingham in 1882. By 1900 the J. Fies and Sons livery stable was by far the largest in the south. Milton Fies was one of six children born to Jacob Fies and Fanne Kahn.

Fies graduated as a Bachelor of Science from Columbia University, School of Mines in 1904. In 1907, he was married to Rose Mayer. From 1904 to 1910, he worked for Republic Iron and Steel Company as a resident engineer and then the superintendent of mines. From 1910 to 1912, he was the general superintendent of mines for the Birmingham Coal and Iron Company, and then subsequently took work with the DeBardeleben coal company.

== Founding of Sipsey, Alabama ==
In 1912–1913 the town of Sipsey, Alabama was laid out by Fies and his wife Rose. Fies was then superintendent of the local mine owned by Henry T. DeBardeleben and vice-president of the company, as accommodation for the miners. Accommodation was segregated in keeping with the Jim Crow practices of the time, though the workers were better paid than in other mines. Funds to construct the new school house at Sipsey ran out before it was finished, but DeBardeleben released more funds to finish it under Fies's urging, however, once it was finished only white residents were allowed to use it, with black residents having to make do with the dilapidated old school house for a number of more years before a new school was finally constructed for them.

== Attitude towards African-Americans and union labour ==
Fies has been praised for supporting the education of African-Americans. During WW1 he supported paying black workers more in order to keep them from migrating to northern states to work in war-related industries as well as other northern industries, however the salaries offered in Birmingham remained less than those paid in the northern states.

Fies also offered poor compensation to injured black workers, offering only $100 to a black worker who was badly burned whilst working at the Sipsey mine. Later in life he declined to endorse the Tuskegee United Negro College Fund, stating that the fund already had enough support from "men of Hebraic religious affiliation" such as himself and that he did not wish to incite anti-Semitic sentiment. Fies also offered to collect money owed to plantation managers by his black workers, essentially sharing them with the plantations. When in 1914, a night boss killed a black miner for being "impertinent" and failing to show up to work, Fies responded by calling in a local deputy to arrest the other black miners who protested the killing, and then fired five of them. He similarly fired a black employee for "insulting" the wife of a company agent, and spoke of "...hanging the negro upon a limb and shooting him full of holes".

Fies preferred a top-down approach to labour management through what he called "company welfare", where the company would offer amenities such as schools and hospitals to their workers. He stated that extending this to black workers was their "reward" for contributing to a "non-union Alabama". Fies had been an outspoken advocate of abolishing the use of convict labour in the mines, however he moderated this position when it became apparent that this might strengthen the hand of the United Mine Workers union. Fies fired a worker who he discovered was acting as a union organiser.

== Coal gasification research ==
Fies took part in research into Coal gasification in co-operation with the US Bureau of mines at Gorgas, Alabama. The research focused on attempts at gasification underground, and involved the first purposeful ignition of coal in-situ in the United States. Initially the coal was ignited using thermite, but later ignition was provided by electrical means, and in a bed prepared via hydraulic fracturing. The research was proposed by Fies in September 1946. Fies took part in five years of experiments of in-situ coal gasification in an attempt to develop a way of burning coal for power without first having to extract it via mining whilst at the Alabama Power Company, and presented the results of this research in 1952, saying that it had come close to being ready for practical application. Fies believed this research was important as he believed that the US would have exhausted its most important mineral reserves by the year 2000 (gasification was believed to be a more efficient way of extracting power), and in order for the US not to fall behind international competitors.

The experiments at Gorgas continued for seven years until 1953, at which point the US Bureau of Mines withdrew its support for them after the US Congress withdrew funding. In total 6,000 tons of coal were combusted by 1953 in these experiments. The experiments succeeded in producing combustible synthetic gas. The experiments were reactivated after 1954, this time with hydrofracturing using a mixture of oil and sand, but finally discontinued in 1958 as uneconomical.

== Awards and accolades ==
Fies was the vice-president of the DeBardeleben company, and was appointed as a consulting engineer of the United States Bureau of Mines by Harold L. Ickes in 1939. In 1949, work was begun on a mine near Madisonville, Kentucky that was to be named after him. The mine was opened in a ceremony in 1950 attended by Fies. In 1952 Fies was a nominee for the 1952 "Man of the South" hall of fame rune by Dixie Business. Fies received the "Conservation Service Award" from the US department of the interior in 1956. He was also declared a "Golden Citizen" by the Birmingham Advertiser Club in the same year. The Alabama Legislature declared Fies an "outstanding civic and industrial leader" in a resolution passed by the legislature in 1965.

His wrote a history entitled A Man with a Light on his Cap-Being a Brief Chronicle of Coal Mining in Walker County: 1912-1960, published in 1960. Fies died at his home in Birmingham on October 20, 1970, at the age of 88.
