= Lum Harris =

American baseball player, coach, and manager (1915–1996)

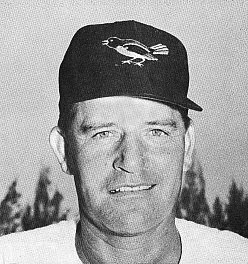
- Harris with the Baltimore Orioles in 1955
- Pitcher / Manager
- Born: January 17, 1915; New Castle, Alabama, U.S.
- Died: November 11, 1996 (aged 81); Pell City, Alabama, U.S.
- Batted: Right Threw: Right

MLB debut
- April 19, 1941, for the Philadelphia Athletics

Last MLB appearance
- May 11, 1947, for the Washington Senators

MLB statistics
- Win–loss record: 35–63
- Earned run average: 4.16
- Strikeouts: 232
- Managerial record: 466–488
- Winning %: .488
- Stats at Baseball Reference

Teams
- As player: Philadelphia Athletics (1941–1946); Washington Senators (1947); As manager: Baltimore Orioles (1961); Houston Colt .45s / Astros (1964–1965); Atlanta Braves (1968–1972); As coach: Chicago White Sox (1951–1954); Baltimore Orioles (1955–1961); Houston Colt .45s (1962–1964)

Chalmer Luman Harris (January 17, 1915 – November 11, 1996) was an American right-handed pitcher, coach, manager, and scout in Major League Baseball.

Born in New Castle, Alabama, Harris attended Mortimer Jordan High School and began his playing career with the Atlanta Crackers of the Southern Association in 1937. His catcher that season was Paul Richards, who in 1938 became Atlanta's player-manager. Richards and Harris would form a decades-long association in baseball at the minor and Major League levels.

== Playing career ==
The 6 ft 1 in (1.85 m), 185 lb (84 kg) Harris compiled a 35–63 record with a 4.16 earned-run average in 151 American League games with the Philadelphia Athletics (1941–1944 and 1946) and Washington Senators (1947). He missed the 1945 season while serving in the United States Navy in the Pacific Theater of Operations during World War II. As a big leaguer, Harris allowed 874 hits and 265 bases on balls in 820 innings pitched and 151 games, with 232 strikeouts. He pitched at the Triple-A level during his last three active seasons in pro ball.

The remainder of Harris's Major League career would be spent working in tandem with Richards, initially as a coach with the Chicago White Sox (1951–1954), Baltimore Orioles (1955–1961) and Houston Colt .45s (1962–1964). In each case he worked under Richards, who was either his manager, general manager, or (in Baltimore from 1955 to 1958) both. Despite his playing background, Harris was never a pitching coach; he usually served as a third-base coach.

== Manager of Astros and Braves ==
1968 picture pack card of Harris for Atlanta Braves

Harris's first managerial experience came late in the 1961 season. On August 30, Richards stepped down as the skipper of the Baltimore Orioles to become the general manager of the expansion Houston Colt .45s, and Harris took command as interim pilot on September 1. He led them to 17 wins in 27 games (.630), as Baltimore finished third in the American League. After the season, however, Harris rejoined Richards in Houston as a coach, while Billy Hitchcock took over as Baltimore's skipper for 1962.

Harris served for almost three full seasons as a Colt .45 coach under Harry Craft, until September 19, 1964, when Richards promoted him to manager. In 1965, Harris helmed the re-christened Houston Astros, serving for the team's debut season in the Astrodome. But the 1965 Astros went only 65–97 to finish ninth in the ten-team National League and, at the end of the year, Richards was fired, and Harris was replaced by Grady Hatton as the Astros' pilot. Harris then served as a Houston scout in 1966.

In August 1966, Richards returned to the major leagues as the vice president for baseball operations (in effect, general manager) of the Atlanta Braves. After that season, Harris rejoined his old boss in 1967 as skipper of the Richmond Braves, Atlanta's Triple-A farm club. Then, from 1968 to the middle of the 1972 season, Harris managed the big-league Braves (ironically, succeeding Hitchcock).

Harris led Atlanta to 93 victories and the first National League West Division championship in 1969—an expansion year when both the National and American leagues grew to 12 teams and adopted divisional play for the first time. It was the franchise's first postseason berth since losing the 1958 World Series as the Milwaukee Braves; however, Harris's squad lost the 1969 National League Championship Series to the eventual world champion New York Mets in three straight games. When the Braves slumped in ensuing years, Richards was fired during the 1972 season, on June 1; slightly more than two months later, on August 6, Harris was replaced as manager by former Braves' third baseman Eddie Mathews. Harris's final managerial record was 466–488 (.488).

Harris died due to ill effects of diabetes at age 81 in Pell City, Alabama. He is buried in Birmingham's Elmwood Cemetery.

=== Managerial record ===
Team	Year	Regular season					Postseason			
Team	Year	Games	Won	Lost	Win %	Finish	Won	Lost	Win %	Result
BAL	1961	27	17	10	.630	3rd in AL	–	–	–	–
BAL total		27	17	10	.630		0	0	–	
HOU	1964	13	5	8	.385	9th in NL	–	–	–	–
HOU	1965	162	65	97	.401	9th in NL	–	–	–	–
HOU total		175	70	105	.400		0	0	–	
ATL	1968	162	81	81	.500	5th in NL	–	–	–	–
ATL	1969	162	93	69	.574	1st in NL West	0	3	.000	Lost NLCS (NYM)
ATL	1970	162	76	86	.469	5th in NL West	–	–	–	–
ATL	1971	162	82	80	.506	3rd in NL West	–	–	–	–
ATL	1972	104	47	57	.452	fired	–	–	–	–
ATL total		752	379	373	.504		0	3	.000	
Total		954	466	488	.488		0	3	.000	
