= Oliver Robinson =

American basketball player and politician

Member of the Alabama House of Representatives from the 58th district
- In office November 4, 1998 – November 30, 2016
- Preceded by: Earnest Johnson
- Succeeded by: Rolanda Hollis

Personal details
- Born: March 13, 1960 (age 66) Birmingham, Alabama, U.S.
- Party: Democratic
- Spouse: Sakina Robinson
- Education: University of Alabama at Birmingham
- Basketball career

Personal information
- Listed height: 6 ft 4 in (1.93 m)
- Listed weight: 180 lb (82 kg)

Career information
- High school: Woodlawn (Birmingham, Alabama)
- College: UAB (1978–1982)
- NBA draft: 1982: 2nd round, 24th overall pick
- Drafted by: San Antonio Spurs
- Playing career: 1982–1983
- Position: Shooting guard
- Number: 1

Career history
- 1982–1983: San Antonio Spurs
- 1983–1984: Ohio Mixers
- 1984: Sarasota Stingers

Career highlights
- Sun Belt Player of the Year (1982); 2× First-team All-Sun Belt (1981, 1982)

Career statistics
- Points: 101 (2.9 ppg)
- Rebounds: 17 (0.5 rpg)
- Assists: 21 (0.6 apg)
- Stats at NBA.com
- Stats at Basketball Reference

Oliver Leon Robinson Jr (born March 13, 1960) is an American former basketball player who played shooting guard for the NBA's San Antonio Spurs. He later served as a Democratic member of the Alabama House of Representatives from 1998 to 2016, representing Alabama House District 58 (Birmingham).

In September 2017 Robinson pleaded guilty to federal charges of bribery, conspiracy, honest services fraud and tax evasion. FBI and IRS investigations determined that Robinson endeavored to thwart the Environmental Protection Agency's proposed efforts to prioritize and expand the 35th Avenue Superfund site in North Birmingham pursuant to a secret contract he had entered into with a lawyer with the Birmingham law firm Balch & Bingham on behalf of its client, coal miner and processor Drummond Company.

== Early life ==
Robinson graduated from Woodlawn High School in Birmingham in 1978 and enrolled in the University of Alabama at Birmingham (UAB). After a season with the San Antonio Spurs, a year in the Continental Basketball Association, and a year spent touring with Athletes in Action, he returned to UAB to graduate in 1987 with a B.S. in Urban Affairs and minors in political science, business and sociology. After graduation he worked as vice president of AmSouth Bank and manager of its Office of Community Affairs. In 1999, the year after he was elected to the House, he cofounded ABI Capital Management, an investment advisory firm and underwriter, with Willie Huff.

With his wife Sakina, also a UAB graduate, he founded Robinson & Robinson Communications. The couple published the biannual Community Reinvestor magazine.

== Basketball career ==
Robinson was a 6'4" guard born in Birmingham, Alabama who played collegiately at the University of Alabama at Birmingham. He has the distinction of being the first player to ever sign a scholarship with the school. At UAB, Robinson was a two-time first team All-Sun Belt Conference pick and was the conference Player of the Year in 1982. In his senior year, Robinson led UAB to their best season as the Blazers went 25–6 and upset No. 1 seed Virginia in the NCAA tournament to reach the Mideast Regional Final, where he was named the Regional MVP. Robinson's number was later retired by the school.

Following his collegiate career, Robinson was drafted by the San Antonio Spurs in the second round of the 1982 NBA draft (24th pick overall). Robinson played in 35 games for the Spurs in the 1982–83 NBA season, averaging 2.9 points per game in limited minutes.

He was elected to the Alabama Sports Hall of Fame in 2008.

== Career statistics ==
Legend
| GP | Games played | GS | Games started | MPG | Minutes per game |
| FG% | Field goal percentage | 3P% | 3-point field goal percentage | FT% | Free throw percentage |
| RPG | Rebounds per game | APG | Assists per game | SPG | Steals per game |
| BPG | Blocks per game | PPG | Points per game | **Bold** | Career high |

=== NBA ===
==== Regular season ====
| Year | Team | GP | GS | MPG | FG% | 3P% | FT% | RPG | APG | SPG | BPG | PPG |
|---|---|---|---|---|---|---|---|---|---|---|---|---|
| 1982–83 | San Antonio | 35 | 0 | 4.2 | .361 | .091 | .667 | .5 | .6 | .1 | .1 | 2.9 |

== Political career ==
Robinson represented the 58th District in the Alabama House of Representatives from 1998 to 2016. At the time of his resignation in 2016 he was the vice-chairman of the Jefferson County Legislative Delegation. He served on the Banking and Insurance, House Education Policy, Financial Services, Military and Veterans Affairs, and Rules committees and had chaired the House Government Operations Committee.

On November 30, 2016, in a press release, Robinson said he wanted to vacate his seat so that his daughter, Amanda Robinson, could keep a job to which she had been appointed as liaison between the Alabama legislature and Governor Robert Bentley's office, and thus avoid the appearance of a conflict of interest. He pointed out that his daughter would be the first African American and the first female in Alabama history to hold that position, and said, "This is why I am retiring now, to give my child every opportunity to succeed." He intended to "focus on the children where I once lived, Gate City and Harris Homes."

Six months later in June 2017, Robinson abruptly announced he was leaving his seat and permanently retiring from politics.

=== Corruption charges ===
In 2017, he was charged and entered into a plea agreement relating to allegations that business interests funneled money into his eponymous nonprofit in exchange for Robinson's opposition to polluted Birmingham neighborhoods being designated EPA Superfund sites.

Later in the month two Balch & Bingham partners working in its Environmental and Natural Resources section, Joel Gilbert, and section chair, Steve McKinney, along with Drummond Company vice-president of government affairs David Roberson, were indicted on "one count of conspiracy to defraud the United States, one count of bribery, three counts of honest services wire fraud, and one count of money laundering conspiracy," with charges against McKinney later dismissed.

On September 27, 2018, Robinson was sentenced to 33 months in federal prison, followed by three years of supervised release. The following month, Gilbert was sentenced to five years and Roberson was sentenced to "two-and-a-half years in prison, followed by one year of supervised release", and each was also fined, pursuant to July 2018 convictions on "six criminal charges each relating to a scheme intended to stop expansion of a toxic cleanup site in Jefferson County by the Environmental Protection Agency", by bribing Robinson, using his nonprofit organization, The Oliver Robinson Foundation.
