= Garry N. Drummond =

American heir and business executive

- Born: Garry Neil Drummond; June 8, 1938; Sipsey, Alabama
- Died: July 13, 2016 (aged 78); Birmingham, Alabama
- Resting place: Sipsey, Alabama
- Education: University of Alabama
- Occupations: Heir; businessman
- Known for: The Drummond Company
- Children: 5
- Parent(s): Heman Edward Drummond; Elza Eliza Stewart
- Relatives: Elbert Allen Drummond (brother)

Garry Neil Drummond Sr. (June 8, 1938 – July 13, 2016) was an American heir, business executive, and philanthropist from Alabama. He served as the chairman and chief executive officer of the Drummond Company, a private coal company active in Alabama and Colombia.

== Early life ==
Garry Neil Drummond Sr. was born in 1938 at Sipsey, Alabama. His father, Heman Edward Drummond, was the founder of the Drummond Company, a coal company, in 1935. Drummond started working in his father's coal mines at the age of fifteen.

He graduated from the University of Alabama in Tuscaloosa, Alabama, with a Bachelor of Science in Civil Engineering.

== Business career ==
=== Drummond Company ===
In 1961, Drummond joined the family business, the Drummond Company, a coal company active in Alabama. He later served as its chief operating officer. He served as its chairman and chief executive officer since 1973. The company is active in coal-mining in Alabama and Colombia.

In 1979-1980, with his brother, Elbert Allen "Larry" Drummond, and another executive, Clyde Black; he was indicted for bribing three Alabama legislators by supplying them with prostitutes. The three-month trial was dismissed by Judge Frank McFadden, and the record was sealed.

In the 1980s, Drummond began looking for coal in Colombia, even though the country was at war. He established their first coal mine in 1995. Shortly after, the FARC bombed the railway track which carried coal from the Drummond mine to their port off the Caribbean Sea.

In 2013, Drummond planned to establish a new coal mine off the bank of the Black Warrior River near Birmingham.

=== Corporate directorships ===
Drummond served on the board of directors of SouthTrust from 2001 to its merger with Wachovia in 2004. He also served as the Director of the Alabama Coal Association. Additionally, he was appointed to the National Coal Council by United States Secretary of Energy Donald P. Hodel in 1984, under the presidency of Ronald Reagan. Later, he served as the Chairman of the Governor's Commission on Affordable Health Care.

Drummond served on the Boards of Directors of the National Mining Association as well as the Economic Development Partnership for Alabama. He was a member of the Alabama Academy of Honor since 1989, the Alabama Engineering Hall of Fame since 1997, and the Alabama Business Hall of Fame since 2003.

Drummond taught Engineering part-time at Walker College.

=== Invention ===
Alongside Eugene Honeycutt and Harold Gene Anderson, Drummond invented a specific method for "open pit bench mining", which has been patented since February 5, 2013.

== Philanthropy and political activity ==
Drummond served on the Executive Board of Directors of the Boy Scouts of America. He also served on the Board of Trustees of his alma mater, the University of Alabama.

Drummond made donations to Republican politicians such as Richard Shelby, Terry Everett, Robert Aderholt, Butch Otter, Mike Rogers, Jo Bonner, as well as to the 2004 re-election of President George W. Bush. He also donated to Coalpac, a political action committee for the National Mining Association. He also donated US$50,000 to Bob Riley's 2002 gubernatorial campaign.

== Personal life and death ==
Drummond was married and had five children. As of 2015, Forbes listed Drummond as the wealthiest individual in Alabama, with an estimated wealth of US$980 million. He died in Birmingham on July 13, 2016, at the age of 78 due to complications from cancer.
