= Louise Wooster =

American madam

- Born: Louise Catharine Wooster; June 12, 1842; Tuscaloosa, Alabama, US
- Died: May 16, 1913 (aged 70); Birmingham, Alabama, US
- Resting place: Oak Hill Cemetery, Birmingham, Alabama; 33°31′32″N 86°49′0″W
- Other names: Lou Wooster
- Occupation: Brothel madam
- Known for: Lou Wooster Public Health Award named in her honor

Louise Catharine Wooster (June 12, 1842 – May 16, 1913), better known as Lou Wooster, was a famous madam in Birmingham, Alabama. Her colorful character and her care for the sick and dying during the cholera epidemic of 1873 endeared her to the Birmingham community. The "Lou Wooster Public Health Award" is named in her honor.

== Overview ==
Louise Wooster was born on June 12, 1842, in Tuscaloosa, Alabama to William Wooster and Mary Chism Wooster. Her father died in 1851 and Mary Wooster remarried. A few years later, Lou's stepfather abandoned the family and took their money with him. Mary Wooster died a few years later virtually destitute.

By her middle teens, Lou was an orphan with nothing to rely on but the mercy of relatives. During this time, she was abused, attempted suicide, and her older sister became a prostitute. She later wrote that she "fell, step by step, until at last I was beyond redemption".

In 1873, Lou was a well-paid lady of the evening when a deadly cholera epidemic swept through Birmingham. Several thousand people fled the city, but Lou stayed to nurse the sick, feed the hungry, and prepare the dead for funerals. After the epidemic, few of Lou's clients remained in Birmingham and she moved to Montgomery, Alabama, to open a brothel.

By 1880, she had returned to Birmingham operating multiple brothels near City Hall where she could attract the wealthiest patrons. Lou made a fortune, donated heavily to charities and frequently came to the aid of fallen women.

Lou was a master at storytelling and self-promotion. She wrote a book chronicling her life titled Autobiography of a Magdalene.

== Death ==
Lou died in 1913 and was buried in Birmingham's Oak Hill Cemetery.

== Honors and recognition ==
The Lou Wooster Public Health Award is presented annually by the University of Alabama School of Public Health to recognize individuals, groups, or organizations who are unconventional public health heroes. The award is named in honor of Lou Wooster, the 19th-century Birmingham madam who risked her own death by staying in the city to care for the sick and dying during the 1873 cholera epidemic. Lou Wooster organized the women in her brothel "determined to stay and help nurse the poor sick and suffering ones who needed me." Her courage went a long way toward assuring there was a Birmingham for the leadership to come back to. When she died in May 1913, hundreds of empty black carriages drove by the funeral home to pay respects to a local hero. Recipients are driven by a horse-drawn carriage from the School of Public Health to Oak Hill Cemetery where Lou Wooster is buried.

The first award was presented in 2007 Representative Patricia Todd, MPA, who is also known as the first openly gay State Representative in Alabama. In 2010 the award was presented to American Electric Power for their efforts to work with environmental groups and other stakeholders to reduce pollution from power production. Master Chef Frant Stitt was recognized in 2011 for his work in improving nutrition by working on urban farms and creating new menus for University Hospital. In 2012 the VF Corporation was recognized for its decision to rebuild the Hackleburg, Alabama Wrangler Distribution Center destroyed by the April 27, 2011 tornado. Rebuilding this facility will have profound impacts on the long-term health of the community.
