= Acmar, Alabama =

- Unincorporated community
- Location within Alabama Location within the United States
- Coordinates: 33°37′17″N 86°29′46″W
- Country: United States
- State: Alabama
- County: St. Clair
- Elevation: 804 ft (245 m)
- Time zone: UTC-6 (Central (CST))
  - Summer (DST): UTC-5 (CDT)
- Area codes: 205, 659
- GNIS feature ID: 164535

Acmar is a former unincorporated community and neighborhood within the city of Moody in St. Clair County, in the U.S. state of Alabama.

== History ==
Henry F. DeBardeleben, founder of the Alabama Fuel & Iron Company (AFICO), opened two coal mines at Acmar. The mines were serviced by the Central of Georgia Railway, with coal production peaking in 1926. In October 1935, one miner was killed and six were injured when strikers belonging to the United Mine Workers of America attempted to drive into the mines. The mines at Acmar closed in 1951. The community was later annexed into the city of Moody.

A post office was established at Acmar in 1911, and remained in operation until it was discontinued in 1987. Acmar is a conjoin of the names Acton and Margaret AFICO also operated mines at both of these locations.

The Cahaba River originates near Acmar.

== Demographics ==
=== Acmar Precinct (1930-50) ===
Historical population
Census	Pop.	Note	%±
1930	1,965		—
1940	1,850		−5.9%
1950	1,616		−12.6%
U.S. Decennial Census

Acmar village has never reported a population figure separately on the U.S. Census as an unincorporated community. However, the 26th precinct within St. Clair County bore its name from 1930 to 1950. In the 1930 and 1940 returns, when the census recorded racial statistics for the precincts, both times reported a White majority for the precinct. In 1960, the precincts were merged and/or reorganized into census divisions (as part of a general reorganization of counties) and it was consolidated into the census division of Moody. The village itself was later annexed into the city of Moody.
