= Oak Hill Cemetery (Birmingham, Alabama) =

- U.S. National Register of Historic Places
- Alabama Register of Landmarks and Heritage
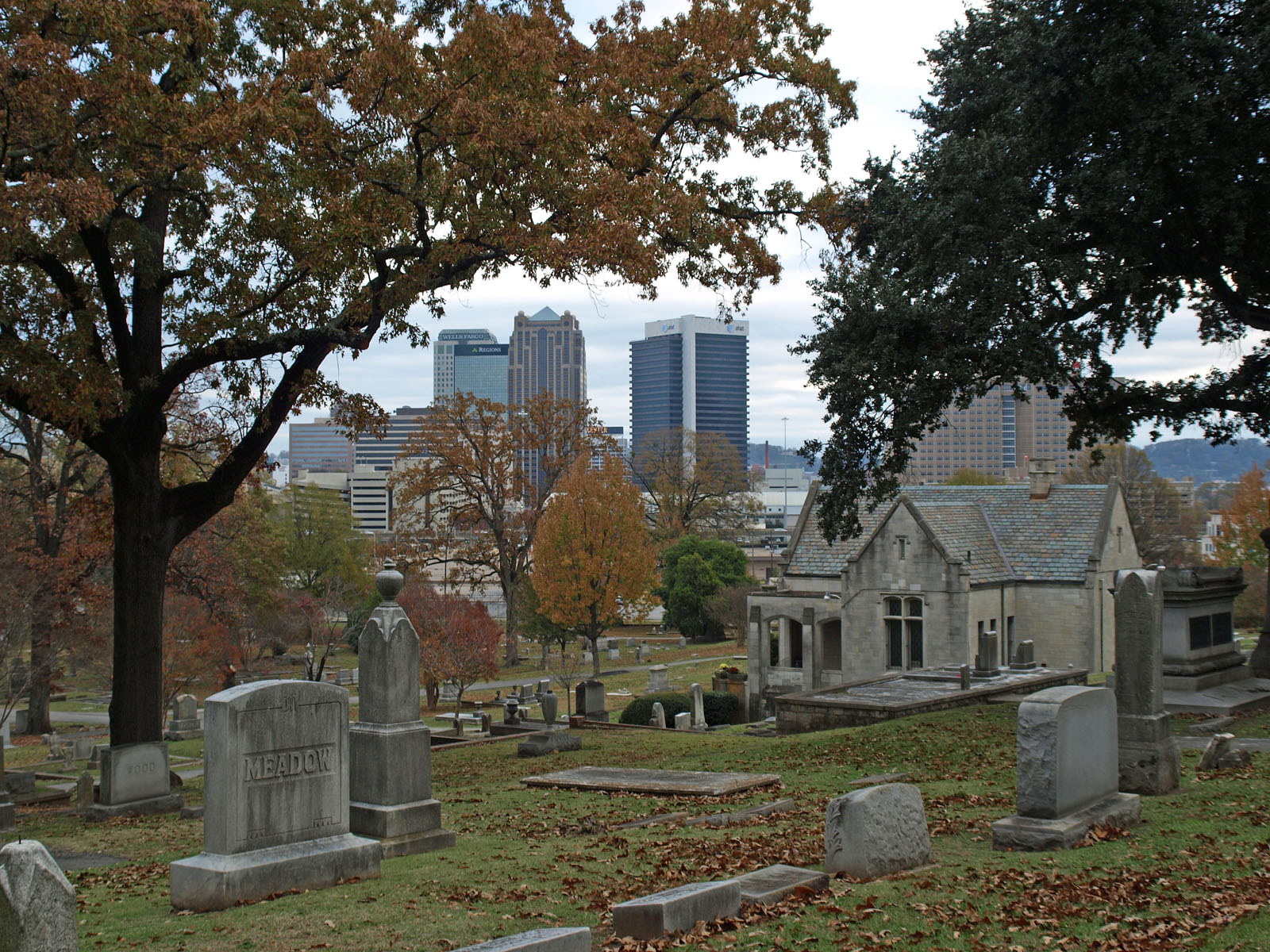
- View of downtown Birmingham from Oak Hill Cemetery

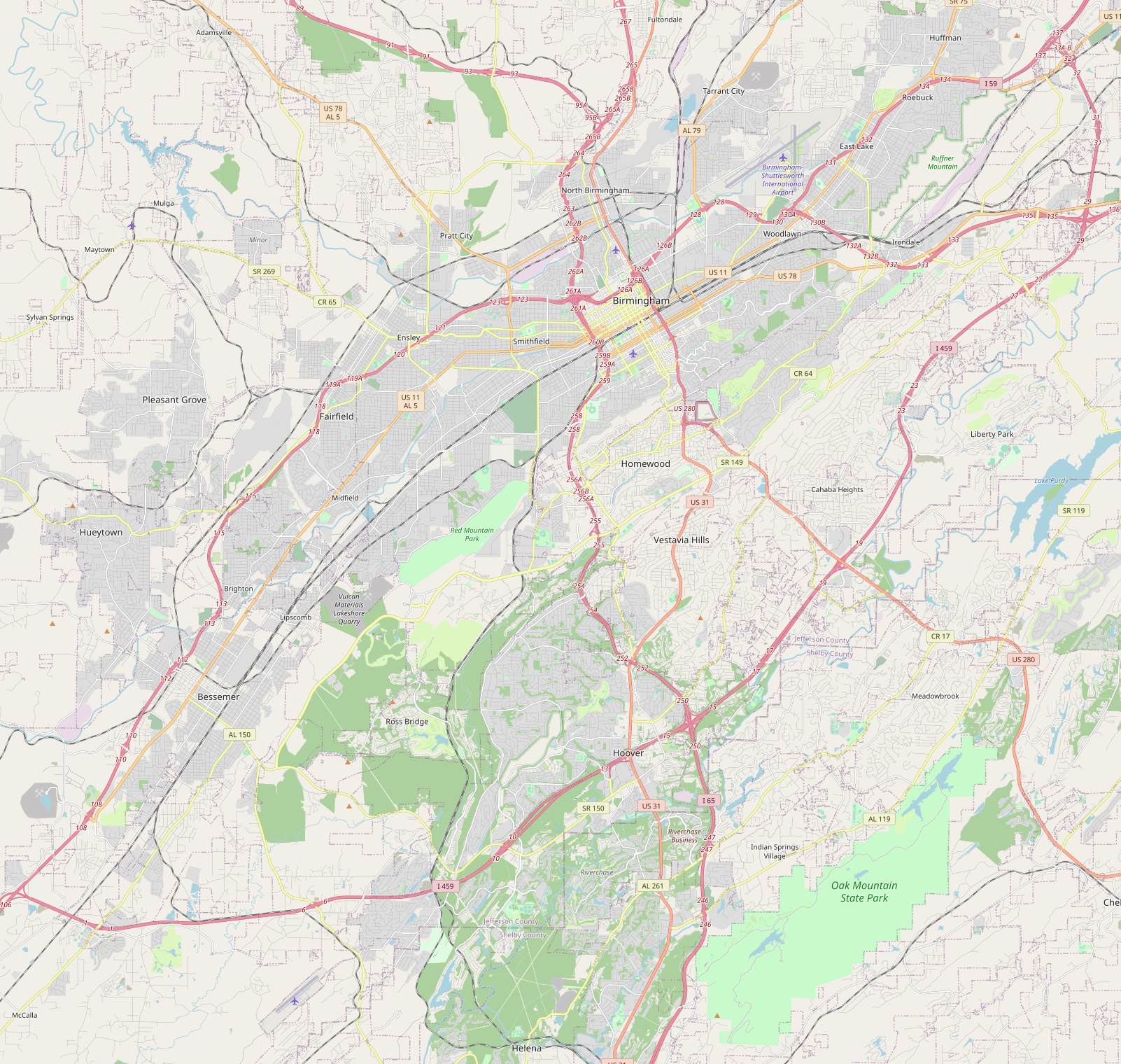
- Location within Birmingham, Alabama Location within Alabama Location within the United States
- Location: 1120 N. 19th St., Birmingham, Alabama
- Coordinates: 33°31′32″N 86°49′0″W
- NRHP reference No.: 77000208

Significant dates
- Added to NRHP: July 13, 1977
- Designated ARLH: October 27, 1975

Oak Hill Cemetery, located just north of downtown, is Birmingham, Alabama's oldest cemetery. Originally 21.5 acres (87,000 m^{2}) on the estate of James M. Ware, it was already a burial ground by April 1869 when it served as the resting place for the infant daughter of future mayor Robert H. Henley. It was marked as "City Cemetery" on the original plats for Birmingham laid out by the Elyton Land Company and was formally sold to the city on December 29, 1873 for the sum of $1,073.50.

Most of the 10,000 or so burials at Oak Hill were interred before 1930, including nine of the ten landholders who founded the city, many early mayors, a Revolutionary soldier, numerous American Civil War veterans, and the first male child born in the city. Although few records exist from the time, most believe the "Potter's Field" section was also used as the final resting place for many victims of the 1873 cholera epidemic.

In 1889 Judge A. O. Lane purchased 200 acres (0.8 km^{2}) on the southern slopes of Red Mountain (Birmingham, Alabama), now Lane Park, for the burial of paupers, thereby ending the use of Oak Hill's "Potter's Field". In 1928 the caretaker's cottage near the center of the property, was removed to the southwest corner of the cemetery and a new "Pioneer's Memorial Building" was constructed of Indiana limestone, designed by Miller & Martin architects with William Kessler, landscape architect.

In 1977, Oak Hill Cemetery was added to the National Register of Historic Places. The Oak Hill Memorial Association keeps an office in the former caretaker's cottage and published a quarterly newsletter, the Oak Hill Pioneer, from Winter 1999 to Fall 2006, with articles about the history of the city in the context of the lives of those buried at Oak Hill.

== Notable burials ==
- Rucker Agee (1897–1985), banker and map collector
- Henry M. Caldwell, president of Elyton Land Company, owner of Peanut Depot building
- William E. B. Davis, pioneer gynecologist
- Henry F. DeBardeleben (1840-1910), industrialist and developed Bessemer
- Ellen Pratt DeBardeleben (1844–1894), daughter of Daniel Pratt
- Frank M. Dixon, Governor of Alabama
- Robert Henley, First mayor of Birmingham
- Walter Henley, coal baron, banker, philanthropist
- Mary T. Jeffries (1863-1930), President, Alabama Woman's Christian Temperance Union
- Mortimer Jordan, health care pioneer
- Charles Linn, industrialist and financier
- W. J. McDonald, acting mayor of Robert Henley
- John T. Milner (1826–1898), railroad engineer, pioneer
- William S. Mudd (1816–1884), builder of Arlington Antebellum Home & Gardens
- Frank P. O'Brien, manufacturer, mayor, industrialist, developer and opera-house owner
- Arthur H. Parker (1870–1939), educator, namesake of A. H. Parker High School
- Edmund Rucker, Confederate Army Colonel
- Fred Shuttlesworth (1922–2011), civil rights leader
- James Sloss, railroad magnate, founder of Sloss Furnaces
- William Hugh Smith, Governor of Alabama 1868–1870
- John William Tayloe (1831–1904), Confederate Army Major Jeff Davis Legion of Hampton's Division, Stuart's Cavalry, Army of Northern Virginia. Born Buena Vista Plantation son of George Plater Tayloe, grandson of John Tayloe III of The Octagon House, great grandson of John Tayloe II of Mount Airy. Architect of Hawthorne
- Louise Wooster, famed Madam
- F. B. Yielding (1864–1948), founder of Yielding department store chain
