= Drummond Company =

American coal mining and processing company

Drummond Company, Inc.
- Company type: Private
- Industry: Coal Mining
- Founded: 1935
- Founder: Heman Edward Drummond
- Headquarters: Birmingham, Alabama, United States
- Key people: Richard Lynn Mullen, Chief Executive Officer
- Products: Coal, By-Products, and Real Estate
- Revenue: ▲$5.00 billion USD (2016)
- Number of employees: 5,100 (2016)
- Website: http://www.drummondco.com/

Drummond Company, Inc. is a privately owned company based in Birmingham, Alabama, United States, involved in the mining and processing of coal and coal products as well as oil and real estate.

== History ==
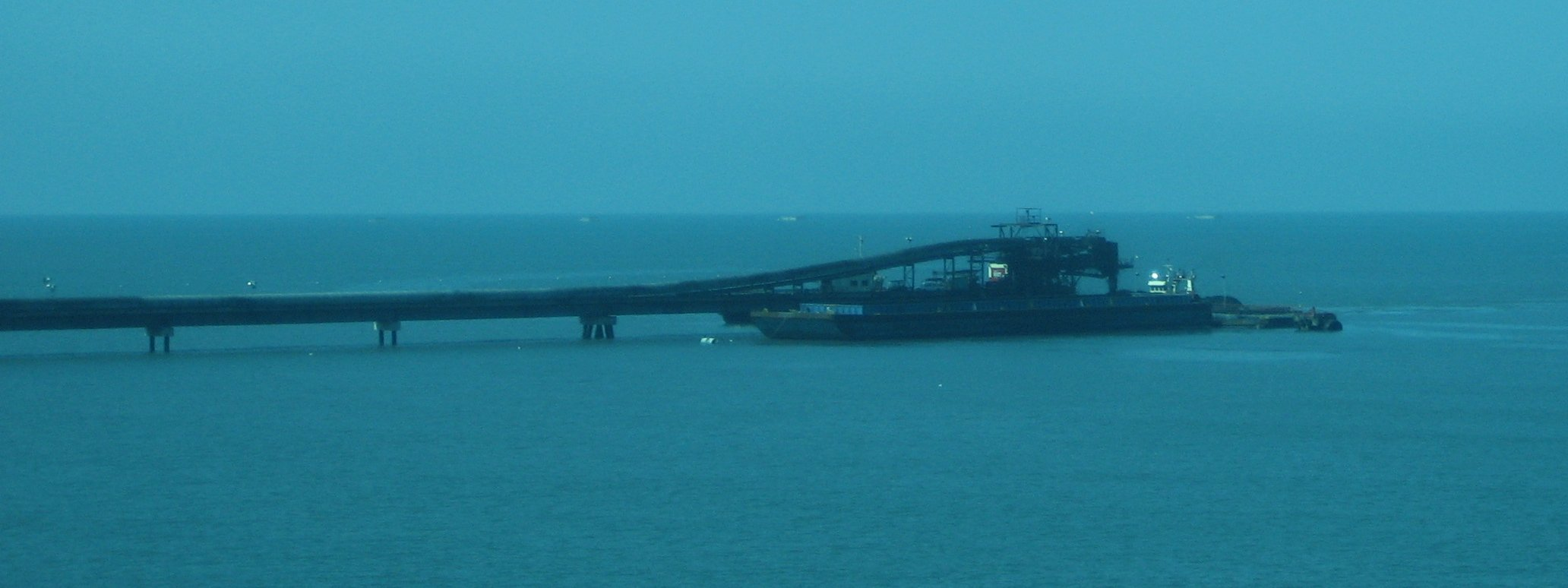
Belt conveyor for coal transportation owned and operated by Drummond Company, located between the city of Santa Marta and the town of Cienaga by the Caribbean Sea in Colombia.

The company was founded in Jasper, Alabama in 1935 by Heman Edward Drummond, an Alabama coal miner. Drummond started mining on land he inherited from his family; he used mules to drag coal out of the mines. When Drummond died in 1956, the company remained family-owned.

In 1970, the company signed a contract to sell coal to Japanese steel companies.

In 1973, Garry N. Drummond, one of the founder's seven children, was appointed as chairman. Another son, Elbert Allen "Larry" Drummond served as vice chairman until his death in 2012. During 1979–1980, these Drummond brothers, along with company executive Clyde Black, were indicted for bribing three Alabama legislators, by means of supplying them with prostitutes. The three-month lawsuit was dismissed by Judge Frank McFadden.

In 2003, the company was sued by widows and orphans of three Colombian labor union leaders who were murdered by paramilitary gunmen near Drummond mines. The lawsuit accused Drummond of "supporting paramilitary fighters at its facilities, thereby making Drummond liable for the deaths." It was known as Estate of Rodriquez v. Drummond Co. By 2009, a U.S. federal court ruled in favor of the company, concluding that it had never supported any action of illegal groups.

In February 2013, journalist Alejandro Arias reported with photographic evidence dumping of hundreds of tons of coal into the Caribbean Sea by the company a month earlier. Based on this evidence the Colombian government temporarily suspended some operations of the company in Santa Marta where the incident occurred. Drummond was also fined US$3.6 million.

As of December 2013, the company employed a workforce of 6,600, with annual sales of US$3 billion. It was inducted into the Alabama Engineering Hall of Fame.

In 2015, the Drummond Company sued attorneys Terrence P. Collingsworth and William R. Scherer, the advocacy group International Rights Advocates (IRAdvocates), and Dutch businessman Albert van Bilderbeek, one of the owners of Llanos Oil, accusing them of violating the Racketeer Influenced and Corrupt Organizations Act by alleging that Drummond had worked alongside Autodefensas Unidas de Colombia to murder labor union leaders within proximity of their Colombian coal mines, which Drummond denies.

In October 2018, David Roberson, previously the company's vice-president of government affairs, was sentenced to "two-and-a-half years in prison, followed by one year of supervised release", and fined $25,000 for his July 2018 convictions, alongside those of attorney Joel Iverson Gilbert (formerly, a partner active in Balch & Bingham's Environmental and Natural Resources section), on "six criminal charges each relating to a scheme intended to stop expansion of a toxic cleanup site in Jefferson County by the Environmental Protection Agency", through a bribe to former basketball player, then state legislator Oliver Robinson (who was also convicted), through use of his nonprofit organization, The Oliver Robinson Foundation. Roberson maintained that he "trusted Joel" [Gilbert] and "never thought we were bribing Oliver Robinson."

== Assets and operations ==
=== Coal mines ===
Drummond operates the Pribbenow and El Descanso mines near La Loma in the Cesar Department in northern Colombia. Both mines produce bituminous coal. Production from Pribbenow, comprising almost 50% of all coal mined in Colombia, is exported to 11 countries. The company is "Colombia’s second-biggest thermal coal producer."

=== Perry Supply ===
The company owns Perry Supply, a subsidiary founded in 1913, which sells "mining, foundry, construction, and industrial supplies."

=== Foundry coke ===
The company also owns Alabama By-Products Corporation, also known as ABC Coke, located in Tarrant, Alabama. According to Forbes, it is "the largest single producer of foundry coke in the U.S.." Starting 2015, Drummond funneled money through its law firm Balch & Bingham to a retired state legislator Oliver Robinson. In exchange for over $100,000, Robinson encouraged residents not to cooperate with the Environmental Protection Agency's efforts to list areas of north Birmingham as a Superfund site due to pollution caused by ABC. In 2017 Robinson pled guilty to various corruption charges.

=== Real estate ===
The company manages "four luxury planned communities in Alabama, Florida and California." In 1985, they developed their first community: Oakbridge in Lakeland, Florida. Over the years, they developed Liberty Park in Vestavia Hills, Alabama, as well as Rancho La Quinta and Andalusia at Coral Mountain in La Quinta, California.

== Alleged involvement with murder of union leaders ==
Drummond has been accused of contracting paramilitaries since 2001 to murder union leaders who oppose company mining policies. In 2000, the local branch of Sintramienergetica, the union that represents hundreds of Drummond workers, held several meetings with executives about contract negotiations and safety concerns. That summer, four mine workers had been killed in a landslide, so workplace safety was an issue. They were also dissatisfied with the food served at the company cafeteria, where the workers ate almost all their meals. For example, workers would allegedly find rocks in the rice. Union members also say that staff at the cafeteria were armed and they felt this was unnecessary and unsafe. Union leaders Valmore Locarno and Victor Orcasita began to receive death threats. They asked Drummond for housing at the mine, so they wouldn't have to commute through areas controlled by paramilitaries. According to the testimony of former president of Drummond Augusto Jimenez, Drummond denied their housing request and Colombia's intelligence agency (Departamento Administrativo de Seguridad, or DAS by its Spanish initials) determined that the threat against them was of “medium to low risk” and did not grant the union leaders any security. About a month later, paramilitaries stopped a company bus carrying union leaders Valmore Locarno and Victor Orcasita and other workers from the La Loma mine at the end of a shift on March 12, 2001. Locarno was shot in the head and Orcasita was tortured and killed. A third union leader, Gustavo Soler, replaced Locarno and was found dead in October.

Drummond strongly denies the allegations. A crew supervisor told an Alabama court in that 2007 case that managers at Drummond's mine, including Locarno's supervisor “said the union and the guerrillas were pretty much one and the same and also that they were responsible for the sabotage of the rail lines.” Drummond's chief of security at the time, former CIA agent Jim Adkins, also believed there was a connection. In an interview with VICE World News in January 2021, Adkins said he still believes the attacks were connected to the tensions in negotiations between the union and the company. “The negotiations would break down and all of a sudden we would get a train blown up,” said Adkins, who believes that the guerrilla groups were enforcing the interests of the union, but declined to provide any proof. However, witnesses claim to have been present in a meeting where a list of names of trade union leaders was produced to be given to a paramilitary commander.

In December 2020, the office of Colombia's attorney general charged two executives from the American coal company Drummond Company Inc. with financing and promoting the paramilitary group that killed these union leaders. The executives, former president of Drummond Augusto Jimenez and current president Jose Miguel Linares, are accused of financing the Autodefensas Unidas de Colombia (AUC), which was the country's largest and deadliest paramilitary group in the decades long civil war in Colombia, during which paramilitaries and the government clashed with leftwing guerrillas. U.S. courts have repeatedly ruled against the families of the Colombian victims.

== See also ==
- Birmingham District
