= Earnest Johnson =

American politician (1952–2024)

Member of the Alabama House of Representatives from the 58th district
- In office 1995–1999
- Preceded by: David Barnes
- Succeeded by: Oliver Robinson

Personal details
- Born: November 30, 1952; Birmingham, Alabama, U.S.
- Died: December 23, 2024 (aged 72)
- Political party: Democratic

Earnest Johnson (November 30, 1952 – December 23, 2024) was an American politician from the state of Alabama. He served as a Democratic Party member of the Alabama House of Representatives from 1995 to 1999.

Born in Birmingham, the son of Johnie and Virginia Sherrer Johnson, he graduated from Springdale High School in 1971. He then served in the U.S. Navy for two years, and subsequently in the U.S. Navy Reserve until 1977. He served as an engineer for CSX Railroad from 1974 to 1988, and in 1985 founded an eponymous funeral home that he would run for the rest of his life. He was elected to the Alabama House of Representatives in 1994, defeating incumbent David Barnes in the Democratic primary, but he in turn was defeated by Oliver Robinson in the 1998 Democratic primary. This came after he faced assault charges from his wife in 1996. He received a bachelor of theology from Birmingham-Easonian Baptist Bible College, becoming a minister. He died on December 23, 2024.

== Electoral history ==
=== 1994 ===
==== Primary election ====
Alabama House of Representatives, District 58, 1994 primary election * denotes incumbent Source:
Party	Candidate	Votes	%
Democratic	Terrace Booker	1,198	29.5
Democratic	Earnest Johnson	1,108	27.3
Democratic	David Barnes *	647	15.9
Democratic	Patrick Packer	434	10.7
Democratic	Ludie Martin	352	8.7
Democratic	James Prayer	318	7.8
Total votes		4,057	100
Runoff election
Democratic	Earnest Johnson	1,889	61.8
Democratic	Terrace Booker	1,169	38.2
Total votes		3,058	100

==== General election ====
Alabama House of Representatives, District 58, 1994 general election * denotes incumbent Source:
Party	Candidate	Votes	%
Democratic	Earnest Johnson	6,055	87.9
Patriot Party (1990s)	Melvin Leland	813	11.8
Write-in		18	0.3
Total votes		6,886	100

=== 1998 ===
==== Primary election ====
Alabama House of Representatives, District 58, 1998 primary election * denotes incumbent Source:
Party	Candidate	Votes	%
Democratic	Oliver Robinson	1,402	46.2
Democratic	Earnest Johnson *	1,081	35.6
Democratic	Frank Matthews	330	10.9
Democratic	Sharon Daniel	199	6.6
Democratic	Ron Whetstone	22	0.7
Total votes		3,034	100
Runoff election
Democratic	Oliver Robinson	1,364	54.4
Democratic	Earnest Johnson	1,143	45.6
Total votes		2,507	100
