= Fies, Kentucky =

Unincorporated community in Kentucky, United States

- Unincorporated community
- Location within Kentucky Location within the United States
- Coordinates: 37°19′20″N 87°22′26″W
- Country: United States
- State: Kentucky
- County: Hopkins
- Elevation: 459 ft (140 m)
- Time zone: UTC-6 (Central (CST))
  - Summer (DST): UTC-5 (CST)
- GNIS feature ID: 492068

Fies is an unincorporated community located in Hopkins County, Kentucky, United States. The town of Fies took its name from the mine founded there in 1950, where most residents worked.

== Fies Mine ==
Fies was home to a coal mine operated by the Miners Coal Company, mining coal from the extension of the Illinois coal basin into Kentucky. Work on opening the mine had already begun in 1949, with the mine scheduled to be served by the Illinois Central, and Louisville and Nashville railroads. The mine was opened in a ceremony in 1950, and named after Milton Fies, a noted engineer and chemist, initially to mine coal from the Kentucky no. 11 coal seam. In 1952 personnel from the mine won the Western Kentucky Mining Institute prize for mine rescue.

The Fies Mine was started as a non-union mine, though the United Mine Workers union attempted to organise there. In 1950 a watchman was killed at the mine in a drive-by shooting during attempts by the UMW to organise at the mine.

By 1972 coal from both the Kentucky no. 9 and Kentucky no. 11 seams were being mined at Fies. By the early 1980s one of the two mines at Fies was scheduled to close. The Fies Mine was abandoned in November 1980.
