= Estate of Rodriquez v. Drummond Co. =

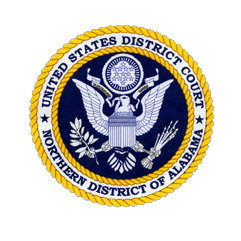
- Court: United States District Court for the Northern District of Alabama
- Full case name: The Estate of Valmore Lacarno Rodriquez, the Estate of Victor Hugo Orcasita Amaya, the Estate of Gustavo Soler Mora, and Sintramienergetic v. Drummond Co., Drummond Ltd, and Garry N. Drummond
- Decided: April 14, 2003
- Docket nos.: 02-cv-0665
- Citation: 256 F. Supp. 2d 1250

Court membership
- Judge sitting: Karon O. Bowdre

Estate of Rodriquez v. Drummond Co., 256 F. Supp. 2d 1250 (N.D. Ala. 2003), was a lawsuit filed in the United States District Court for the Northern District of Alabama by relatives of dead workers who Drummond Company employed.

Sintraminergetica has sued Drummond Company for allegedly conspiring with paramilitary groups to exterminate the union. This suit was brought after years of claims of abuses ranging from forcing potential employees to undergo lie detector tests to reveal their political affiliation as a condition of employment, to the assassination of union leaders, their displacement from the mining zones, and accusations made against them of being guerilla supporters. On March 12, 2001, Valmore Locarno Rodriguez and Victor Hugo Orcasita Amaya, the president and vice president of the union local, were taken from a company bus en route from the mine to their homes. Locarno was assassinated with two shots to the head in front of his coworkers. Over the protests of the workers, Orcasita was taken away in a truck. The next day, his body was found, with obvious signs of torture. On October 5 of the same year, under similar circumstances, Gustavo Soler, the union's new president, was taken from a bus, taken away in a pick-up, tortured, and killed. His body was found on October 7 by people from the area.

The court ruled that Sintraminergetica has standing to bring suit against Drummond and the Colombian managers of the company under the Alien Tort Statute. The crimes that were claimed to be committed violated the International Labour Organization (ILO) pacts and agreements, and were also crimes against humanity and war crimes, according to U.S. and international law.

On June 21, 2007, the Birmingham News reported that the US district judge presiding over the case in Birmingham dismissed the wrongful death charges against Drummond. The company is still being tried for a war crimes claim filed under the U.S. Alien Tort Statute.

On July 26, 2007, jurors in the case found Drummond not liable for the deaths of the three union representatives and rejected the claims by Sintraminergetica that the company aided in the deaths.

Drummond Company claims it has brought many jobs to the country and a level of stability to the mostly impoverished small town (corregimiento) of La Loma, Cesar, which has suffered civil unrest and corruption scandals. The company established a village for the mine workers and their families to live. The Drummond family established a school in the town for the mine workers' children.
