= Farquhar Cattle Ranch =

Former prison in Alabama, United States

- Location in Alabama
- Location: 1132 County Road 73 Greensboro, Alabama; 32°37′45″N 87°41′07″W
- Status: closed
- Security class: minimum security
- Capacity: about 100
- Opened: 1956
- Closed: 2013
- Managed by: Alabama Department of Corrections

Charles A. Farquhar State Cattle Ranch was an Alabama Department of Corrections state prison for men, located south of the town of Greensboro in unincorporated Hale County, Alabama.

== History ==
The ranch was purchased by the state of Alabama in 1940 and had been operated by director and warden Charles A. Farquhar as a working cattle ranch and catfish hatchery in 1956, in part to contribute to Alabama's "perennially underfunded corrections budget". It was originally named the State Cattle Ranch.

In 1982 Governor of Alabama Fob James issued a proclamation renaming the prison ranch in Farquhar's honor. In 1994 Farquhar was the oldest warden in Alabama. His wife, Doris, worked for the corrections department since 1972 as a clerk.

=== Murder of Farquhar ===
On October 23, 1994, the 74-year-old Farquhar was murdered on the grounds, along with his wife Doris and two trusties. The killer, a 27-year-old prisoner named Kelvin O'Neal Washington, had been previously convicted of first degree attempted theft and attempted murder of a police officer and had two concurrent 20 year sentences. He bludgeoned the warden, and shot dead two prisoners. They were 60-year-old Paul Leverett of Mobile County, Alabama and Clifton Dale "Kipp" Martin Jr. of Lawrence County, Alabama. Both of the deceased inmates were convicted of murder and were serving life sentences. Jimmy Evans, the Attorney General of Alabama, stated that the gun used to shoot the prisoners was also used to beat the Farquhars. Initial reports stated that the wife was beaten to death. The killer confessed to the crimes and stated that he beat, and then tied up, 68-year-old Doris Farquhar inside the warden's house and set the house on fire while Doris was still inside. According to Washington, he burned the house to cover up evidence of the crime. The bodies of both Farquhar and his wife were in the house. One inmate's body was in the carport and another was in the house.

The sons of the warden, Robbie and Andy Farquhar, gave their condolences to the dead prisoners. The killer was held in the Montgomery County Jail and given a capital murder charge; he was denied bond. Larry Johnson, the sheriff of Hale County, stated that the Farquhar murders were "possibly" the state's deadliest incident of prison violence and, as far as he knew, the largest mass murder in the county's history.

=== Post-murder ===
Charles Thompson, a man from Huntsville, Alabama, replaced Farquhar as the warden. Even after Farquhar's killing prisoners were allowed relative freedom to work the ranch on horseback. Since 2008 about 75% of the property has been purchased by Alabama's Forever Wild Land Trust and re-designated as state recreation land.

A convicted murderer escaped from the prison facility in April 2012. Bill Adair, the district attorney of Walker County, Alabama, stated in the Jasper Daily Mountain Eagle that he opposed placement of convicted murderers on open ranchland. The prison ranch closed on July 31, 2013.

== Property ==
The 4,610-acre (1,870 ha) property is in unincorporated Hale County, Alabama, in the Black Belt area. The Black Warrior River and Alabama Highway 69 South bounded the property, which was about 10 miles (16 km) south of Greensboro, and 50 miles (80 km) south of Tuscaloosa.

The prison had baseball fields, duck ponds, and picnic pavilions. The prison housed the system's second largest cattle operation. Richard Fausset of the Los Angeles Times wrote in 2006 that the dormitories were "spartan".

Prior to the 1994 murder, the warden's residence was about .25 miles (0.40 km) from the prison barracks and connected to the gates of the property through a narrow road.

== Operations ==
A 1994 article in the Tuscaloosa News stated that the prison was "more like a plantation than a prison". The prison had no fences, and unlike in other prisons, prisoners had access to fresh air. The Tuscaloosa News stated that family members of prisoners at Farquhar posting on Prisontalk described the prison in a manner similar to that of the 1994 article. In 2006 Fausset stated that "Transferring there is considered a privilege."

Posters on Prisontalk stated that prisoners and their families could walk on the grounds or enjoy food cooked on a grill. One forum member describing herself as a mother of a prisoner stated that visitors were not searched and that the prison was "a country club compared to others".

In 2006 Fausset stated that the prison work was "demanding".

== Sale ==
In 2002, businessman Elbert Allen Drummond donated US$51,750 to Bob Riley's gubernatorial campaign. Later, he was able to acquire land sold from the former Farquhar Cattle Ranch. Critics questioned the donation, even though Drummond denied any wrongdoing.
