= John T. Milner =

Worker, engineer, politician and founder of Birmingham, Alabama

Colonel John Turner Milner
- Born: September 9, 1826; Pike County, Georgia
- Died: August 18, 1898; New Castle, Alabama
- Resting place: Oak Hill Cemetery
- Occupations: Businessman, land surveyor, engineer, politician
- Known for: Key role in the founding of Birmingham, Alabama.
- Title: Member of the Alabama Senate
- Term: 1888-1895
- Political party: Democratic Party

John Turner Milner (September 9, 1826 – August 18, 1898) was a railroad worker, civil engineer, land surveyor, businessman, and politician. Milner is remembered for his role in the founding of Birmingham, Alabama.

== Early life ==
Milner was born in Pike County, Georgia, on September 9, 1826. He was the son of engineer William Justice Milner and Mary Ann Turner. He spent his early youth working in the mining operations in Lumpkin County, Georgia, and in the goldfields near Dahlonega, Georgia. Upon discovering a gold seam with his father c. 1843, Milner was sent by his father to study engineering at the University of Georgia in Athens. Milner was forced to withdraw after three years of studies due to poor health.

== Career ==
=== Railroad engineer ===
Upon graduating from the University of Georgia, Milner was employed by railroad engineer George Hazlehurst on the Macon & Western Railroad, working as a surveyor. Around this time, Milner also worked as a surveyor for the Muscogee Railroad, which was later incorporated into the Columbus and Macon Railroad. Eventually, the Columbus and Macon Railroad, along with many other small railroads, would be absorbed and consolidated into the Louisville and Nashville Railroad.

=== California ===
In 1842, Milner left for California, then still part of Mexico. He was appointed as a city planner for the city of San Jose, California by the provincial governor, Juan Bautista Alvarado. Milner returned to the eastern United States in the early 1850s, marrying Flora J. Caldwell in 1855. The couple would have four children together.

=== Creation of Birmingham, Alabama ===
By 1870, Milner was the chief engineer for the North and South Railroad of Georgia, and owner of Milner Coal and Railroad Mines Company. Inspired by the increasingly prosperous steel industry in Pittsburgh, Milner intended to establish an industrial city of his own in the Deep South to capitalize on the expanding steel industry and to compete with Northern industrialists. The sparsely populated Jones Valley in north-central Alabama was surveyed by Milner by order of Alabama Governor Andrew B. Moore for the upcoming South and North Alabama Railroad in 1858. Milner served as chief engineer of the North and South Alabama Railroad, also known as the Central of Alabama Railroad, from 1858 to 1872.

The Jones Valley, according to Birmingham journalist and author Diane McWhorter in her 2001 Pulitzer prize winning book Carry Me Home, contained "reputedly the only place on earth where the essential ingredients of iron-making existed in one spot—coal, iron ore, and lime." The abundance of these resources in the Jones Valley made it an ideal site for future industrial development.

The recent development of the Bessemer process of steel production, patented by Pittsburgh inventor William Kelly in 1851, allowed for the steel industry in the United States to expand dramatically following the end of the American Civil War. In the years following the American Civil War, the city of Pittsburgh became the epicenter for American steel production. Pittsburgh steel magnates such as Andrew Carnegie, Henry Clay Frick, and Charles M. Schwab acquired vast fortunes during this period.

Milner was able to purchase land in the Jones Valley with financial assistance from his friend Josiah Morris, a former cotton merchant, railroad businessman, and banker in Montgomery, Alabama. Morris was president of the Mobile & Montgomery Railroad Company and director of the South and North Alabama Railroad. He was also the owner of the Morris Bank, and went on to organize the Elyton Land Company in Elyton, Alabama in 1870.

On January 26, 1871, a meeting between stockholders of the Elyton Land Company was held at the offices of Josiah Morris & Company in Montgomery to discuss the creation of a new city in the Jones Valley. The attendees known to be present at this meeting were:

- Josiah Morris, 437 shares.
- James R. Powell, 360 shares.
- Samuel Tate, 360 shares.
- William S. Mudd, 180 shares.
- William F. Nabers, 180 shares.
- Benjamin P. Worthington, 133 shares.
- Henry M. Caldwell, 120 shares.
- James N. Gilmer, 120 shares.
- Bolling Hall, 120 shares.
- Campbell Wallace, 120 shares.

Milner further built a railroad to the Jones Valley in order to facilitate the planned development of both an urban center and new industrial sites. His efforts surveying the Jones Valley played a key role in the route of the Central of Alabama Railroad. Milner coordinated efforts to develop the region, becoming instrumental to the founding of Birmingham and the surrounding urban centers. Many places in the Birmingham area continue to reflect the city's industrial lineage, such as the cities of Bessemer and Irondale. To this end, Milner played a key role in Alabama's industrialization in the post-Civil War Reconstruction Era.

== Politics ==
=== State Senator ===
Milner represented Jefferson County in the Alabama Senate from 1888 to 1895. During his tenure, Milner promoted the local business interests of Jefferson County, established labor laws to protect miners, and remained involved in railroad regulation and expansion.

=== Racist views and publications ===
Milner was a white supremacist, publishing a pamphlet named White Men Stand Together, 1860 and 1890 in 1890, whilst serving in the Alabama Senate. In the pamphlet, Milner argues against the enfranchisement of African Americans, advocating for the supremacy of whites throughout the South. Furthermore, Milner accused the Republican Party of using freedmen to stir unrest amongst Southern Whites. His pamphlet also stressed the importance of loyalty to his own Democratic Party amongst Southern Whites.

Ironically, his own creation, the city of Birmingham, later became a center of the Civil Rights movements in the 1950s and 1960s.The Birmingham Campaign, a Civil Rights campaign led by Martin Luther King, Jr. and Fred Shuttlesworth, alongside King's Letter From Birmingham Jail, made Birmingham internationally famous as a symbol of white supremacy, civil unrest in the American South, and the wider African American civil rights movement.

He died in New Castle, Alabama of paralysis and was interred at Oak Hills Cemetery in Birmingham, Alabama.

=== "Slavery by Another Name" ===
According to a 2011 PBS documentary: "(Milner) was also a supreme racist and a despotic person." He stated, for example, "Negro labor can be made exceedingly profitable in manufacturing iron and in rolling mills, provided there is an overseer: a Southern man who knows how to manage Negroes." After emancipation, Milner was instrumental in the movement of industrialists to replace slavery with "convict" Black laborers. His influence was also a primary cause of peonage. He found that it was impossible to drive "free" labor the same way that they could force prisoners to mine and build railroad infrastructure. This is why people like Milner wanted prisoners in his coal mines. He saw them as a great source of profit and did not have to worry about labor disputes.

== Later life ==
He died in New Castle, Alabama of paralysis on August 18, 1898 and was interred at Oak Hills Cemetery in Birmingham, Alabama.
