= Alliance of Business Immigration Lawyers =

The Alliance of Business Immigration Lawyers (ABIL) is a global alliance of 36 law firms and 1000 law professionals that provides immigration law services to companies in 50 countries (17 containing ABIL members, and the remaining containing affiliates). Their services including helping companies with strategic planning of temporary assignments and long-term relocations, migration concerns of employees and their families, compliance with country-specific immigration status and work authorization requirements governmental advocacy, and the preparation and submission of necessary legal documents.

== Industries served ==
ABIL serves a number of industries in the US and worldwide, including agriculture, arts and entertainment, automotives, biotechnology, construction, consulting, education, energy, financial services, healthcare, hospitality, information technology, manufacturing, pharmaceutical, religious workers, and sports.

== Lobbying and advocacy ==
ABIL has funded non-profit work to advocate for changes to the migration regime, with a particular focus on the United States. For instance, it provided initial funding for a Green Card stories book to the Immigration Policy Center (a branch of the American Immigration Council). It was also one of more than 450 business groups to sign on to an open letter to the United States Congress to enact immigration reform.

== People ==
ABIL was founded by immigration lawyer Angelo Paparelli, who also served as the first president of the organization. Paparelli runs his own blog-cum-website called "Nation of Immigrators" and also posts to Immigration Daily, a leading website on US immigration.

ABIL's current President is Sharon Mehlman, managing partner of an immigration law firm in San Diego, California.

== Reception ==
=== Reception in external ranking services ===
The ABIL website claims that each of its 19 U.S. members is listed in two or more of the world's established ranking services for immigration lawyers: Chambers Global and USA, Best Lawyers in America, International Who's Who of Business Immigration Lawyers, Martindale Hubbell AV ratings, and more.

ABIL is listed as a resource by EB5info.com, a website on the EB-5 visa.

=== Media reception ===
ABIL past president Charles Kuck as well as founder and past president Angelo Paparelli have been cited and quoted (in their capacity as ABIL affiliates) in The New York Times, The Wall Street Journal, and Forbes.
