= First Baptist Church (Jasper, Alabama) =

Coordinates: 33°50′7″N 87°16′44″W

First Baptist Church, also known as Jasper's First Baptist Church (JFBC or Jasper's FBC), is a Baptist in Jasper, Alabama. It is affiliated with the Southern Baptist Convention. JFBC is the largest church by both facility square footage and membership in Walker County.

== History ==
The church was founded in 1909.

=== Family Life Center ===
The Family Life Center (FLC) was opened in 1989. Amenities include a full court basketball gymnasium, walking track (1/18 mile), table games, a cafeteria with removable walls, a full-service kitchen, as well as choral and music facilities.

The FLC sits on a parcel of land once occupied by the parsonage and its adjoining playground. The parsonage served dual duties, acting as both meeting space for Sunday School classes, as well as personal residence to then music minister, Conrad Howell.

When it was decided that the FLC would be constructed on the site, JFBC sold the parsonage to a private individual. The parsonage was then cut into two pieces and moved to another location outside of Heritage Hills, a Jasper neighborhood.

=== Sanctuary ===
Opened on January 24, 1999, the current sanctuary seats approximately 950 people. The capacity of the previous sanctuary was approximately 700 and, after a vote by church members, was demolished in 1997 to allow for church growth. During the construction of the new sanctuary, services were held in the cafeteria of the Family Life Center.

On the outside of the new sanctuary, measuring eight feet wide by twelve feet tall and weighing 1,200 pounds is a stained glass window in memory of member Pat Grimes, who died in 1991.

=== Youth Center ===
In 2003 Jasper's FBC purchased the facility previously owned by Collins-Burke Funeral Home. The building now houses a small sanctuary, as well as meeting rooms. Prior to their current facility, JFBC youth met in a church-owned facility next to the Family Life Center.
