= Joan DeBardeleben =

Joan DeBardeleben is a scholar of Russian and European politics and professor of political science at Carleton University in Canada. She graduated from University of Wisconsin; she is a Chancellor Professor and a Jean Monet Scholar. Her work on Russia deals mostly with regional politics, patronage at the regional level and the impact of EU enlargement.

Debardeleben is the daughter of Lionel Arthur DeBardeleben, a Second World War veteran, and Helen Thomas DeBardeleben, who had been a social worker for the State of Wisconsin until her retirement.

== Works ==
DeBardeleben's key works are:

- Economic Crisis in Europe: What it Means for the European Union and Russia (Palgrave Macmillan, 2013, co-editor with Crina Viju), including the chapter "The Economic Crisis, the Power Vertical and Prospects for Liberalization in Russia".
- "The 2011-2012 Russian Elections: The Next Chapter in Russia’s Post Communist Transition?," in J. L. Black and Michael Johns, eds, From Putin to Medvedev to Putin – Continuity, Change or Revolution? (Routledge, 2013).
- "Applying constructivism to understanding EU–Russian relations," International Politics, 49 (2012), 418–433
- The Transition to Managerial Patronage in Russia's Regions" (with Mikhail Zherebtsov), in The Politics of Sub-National Authoritarianism in Russia, Vladimir Gel’man and Cameron Ross, eds. (Aldershot: Ashgate, 2010), pp. 85–105.
- "The Impact of EU Enlargement on the EU-Russian Relationship," in A Resurgent Russian and the West: The European Union, NATO, and Beyond, in Roger E. Kanet, ed. (Dordrecht, Netherlands: Republic of Letters Publishing, 2009, in press), pp. 93–112.
- Activating the Citizen: Dilemmas of Citizen Participation in Europe and Canada (Palgrave Macmillan, 2009, co-editor, with Jon H. Pammett) including the chapter "New Members, Old Issues: The Problem of Voter Turnout in European Parliament, pp. 106–127.
