= American Family Business Institute =

U.S. estate-tax repeal campaign and trade association

The American Family Business Institute (AFBI) is a trade association of business owners, farmers, and entrepreneurs working for permanent repeal of the United States federal estate tax. The organization was founded in 1994.

AFBI has been the leader of the Washington, D.C. estate tax repeal coalition since 2004. During the 2005 estate tax fight the organization worked closely with Senate and House leadership and the White House to build Congressional support for the H.R. 8 repeal bill. Since then, the Institute has continued to be active on the issue, educating Congress, the media and the public about the costs of the estate tax and building Congressional pressure for permanent repeal.

The organization's mission, as stated on its 990 tax filings, is to “Promote public policies that lead to the abolition of the Death Tax; to protect the fundamental relationship of personal property to liberty; and to preserve family businesses and entrepreneurship as a foundation of the American way of life.”

== History and major initiatives ==
=== Leadership ===
First led by estate planning attorney Harold Apolinski, AFBI's president since 2004 has been Dick Patten. Patten is a national expert on the estate tax and its effect on family businesses and farms. He often appears in print and broadcast media.

Patten is a former family business owner and the activist who filed Initiative 402 to repeal the Washington State Inheritance and Gift Taxes. The organization he founded collected approximately 200,000 signatures and Initiative 402 was approved by 72% of Washington state voters.

=== Death Tax Repeal Pledge Project ===
On November 2, 2010, American voters elected or re-elected 131 U.S. Senate and House candidates and incumbents who signed AFBI's “Death Tax Repeal Pledge.” Over 500 candidates signed and over 250 of these won their primaries.

=== American Family Business Foundation ===
In 2008, the IRS granted 501(c)3 non-profit status to the American Family Business Foundation.

The Foundation has published studies about the impact of the Federal Estate Tax on small business job-creation, federal revenue collection, wealth concentration and other areas where the estate tax and family business needs intersect.
