= Henry T. DeBardeleben =

American coal magnate (1874–1948)

- Born: Henry Ticknor DeBardeleben; January 2, 1874; Birmingham, Alabama, US
- Died: November 2, 1948 (aged 74)
- Burial place: Elmwood Cemetery (Birmingham, Alabama)
- Occupation: Businessman
- Political party: Republican Party
- Spouses: Julie Thomas; Donie Drane
- Children: 3 sons, 2 daughters
- Parent: Henry F. DeBardeleben

Henry Ticknor DeBardeleben (January 2, 1874 – November 2, 1948) was an American coal magnate from Alabama.

== Early life ==
Henry Ticknor DeBardeleben was born on January 2, 1874, in Birmingham, Alabama. He attended Howard College, now known as Samford University, and the Alabama Polytechnic Institute, now known as Auburn University, from which he graduated in 1892. He also studied at Eastman Business College in Poughkeepsie, New York.

== Career ==
DeBardeleben started his career as the superintendent of the Alice Furnace, owned by the Tennessee Coal, Iron and Railroad Company, from 1894 to 1895. He went on to serve as the superintendent of the Watts Iron and Steel Syndicate from 1896 to 1898, followed by the Gracie Woodward Iron Company in 1896, the Woodward Iron Company from 1897 to 1898, and the Red River Furnace Company from 1899 to 1904. He then served as the manager of furnaces and mines near Alice Creek in Tennessee, owned by the Bon Air Coal and Iron Company. By 1907, he was appointed as the Vice President of the Woodstock Iron and Steel Corporation of Anniston, Alabama.

From 1909 to 1948, DeBardeleben served as the President of the Russellville Iron Ore and Metal Company of Russellville, Alabama and his father's Alabama Fuel and Iron Company. In 1910, he was also appointed as the President of the Maryland Coal and Coke Company. In 1912, the company founded the town of Sipsey in Walker County, Alabama, and established the Sipsey Mine. In 1915, DeBardeleben took ownership of the company and renamed it the DeBardeleben Coal Company in 1915. He served as its President. He founded Sipsey as a company town in the 1920s. He acquired the Empire Coal Company as well as the Carona Coal Company in 1922. By 1940, he acquired a factory in Holt, Alabama. By 1948, he owned 100,627 acres of mining land across Walker County, Cullman County, and Fayette County. One of his employees was Heman Edward Drummond, who went on to found the Drummond Company.

Additionally, DeBardeleben served as the Vice President and Director of the National Coal Association. He was strongly opposed to labor unions.

== Personal life ==
He was married twice. He married his wife, Julie Thomas, in 1896; she died in 1910. He married a second time to Donie Drane. He had three sons and two daughters. One of his sons, Newton Hanson DeBardeleben, married Virginia Swann, the daughter of Theodore Swann, the president of the Southern Manganese Corporation, later acquired by Monsanto. He was an Episcopalian, and a member of the Republican Party.

== Death ==
He died on November 2, 1948.
