= New Castle, Alabama =

Unincorporated community in Alabama, United States

- Unincorporated community
- Location within Alabama Location within the United States
- Coordinates: 33°38′56″N 86°46′07″W
- Country: United States
- State: Alabama
- County: Jefferson
- Elevation: 531 ft (162 m)
- Time zone: UTC-6 (Central (CST))
  - Summer (DST): UTC-5 (CDT)
- ZIP code: 35119
- Area codes: 205, 659
- GNIS feature ID: 152613

New Castle is an unincorporated community in Jefferson County, Alabama, United States. New Castle is 9 miles (14 km) north of downtown Birmingham. New Castle has a post office with ZIP code 35119. New Castle was formerly home to coal mines operated by John T. Milner.
