= Ithaca High School =

Ithaca High School may refer to:

- Ithaca High School (Ithaca, New York)
- Ithaca High School (Michigan)
- Ithaca High School (Wisconsin)
