= Henry F. DeBardeleben =

American businessman (1840–1910)

- Born: Henry Fairchild DeBardeleben; July 22, 1840; Autauga County, Alabama, US
- Died: December 6, 1910 (aged 70)
- Resting place: Oak Hill Cemetery
- Occupation: Businessman
- Political party: Democratic Party
- Spouses: Ellen Pratt; Katherine McCrossin
- Children: 4 sons (including Henry T. DeBardeleben), 3 daughters

Henry Fairchild DeBardeleben (July 22, 1840 - December 6, 1910) was an American coal magnate and town founder from Alabama.

== Early life ==
Henry F. DeBardeleben was born on July 22, 1840, in Autauga County, Alabama. His father, Henry DeBardeleben, was a cotton plantation owner. After his father died when he was ten years old, DeBardeleben moved to Montgomery, Alabama, with his mother, where he worked in a grocery store. At the age of sixteen, he became Daniel Pratt's ward.

During the American Civil War of 1861-1865, he served in the Prattville Dragoons of the Confederate States Army.

== Career ==
After the war, DeBardeleben was appointed by Pratt as the manager of the Helena Mines in Helena, Alabama. In the 1870s, he helped rebuild the Oxmoor furnace. When Pratt died in 1873, DeBardeleben inherited Red Mountain Iron and Coal Company. A few years later, in 1878, he co-founded Pratt Coal and Coke Company with other investors. He also founded the Alice Furnace Company. Later, he co-founded the DeBardeleben Coal and Iron Company. By 1887, the company owned 150,000 acres of land for coal and iron mining, and it was worth US$13 million. It merged with the Tennessee Coal, Iron and Railroad Company in 1891, when DeBardeleben was appointed as its Vice Chairman.

DeBardeleben served as the President of the Alabama Fuel and Iron Company. With his sons, DeBardeleben established coal and iron mines in Margaret in St. Clair County and Acton in Shelby County. He also established two mines in Acmar, St. Clair County. He was the first person to produce pig iron in the Birmingham area.

DeBardeleben also founded the Bessemer Land and Improvement Company, which developed the town of Bessemer, Alabama. He was an investor in the Birmingham Rolling Mills and the Birmingham National Bank.

== Personal life ==
DeBardeleben married Ellen Pratt, who was Daniel Pratt's only daughter, in 1863, in the midst of the Civil War. After she died in 1893, he got married a second time to Katherine McCrossin in 1898. DeBardeleben was a member of the Methodist Episcopal Church, South, and a member of the Democratic Party.

== Death and legacy ==
DeBardeleben died on December 6, 1910. He was buried at the Oak Hill Cemetery in Birmingham, Alabama. He was inducted into the Alabama Men's Hall of Fame in 1998.
