= Sipsey, Alabama =

- Town
- Location of Sipsey in Walker County, Alabama.
- Coordinates: 33°49′21″N 87°05′00″W
- Country: United States
- State: Alabama
- County: Walker

Area
  - Total: 0.48 sq mi (1.25 km^{2})
  - Land: 0.48 sq mi (1.24 km^{2})
  - Water: 0 sq mi (0.00 km^{2})
- Elevation: 420 ft (130 m)

Population (2020)
  - Total: 363
  - Density: 755.4/sq mi (291.68/km^{2})
- Time zone: UTC-6 (Central (CST))
  - Summer (DST): UTC-5 (CDT)
- ZIP code: 35584
- Area codes: 205, 659
- FIPS code: 01-70704
- GNIS feature ID: 2407346

Sipsey is a town in Walker County, Alabama, United States. As of the 2020 census, Sipsey had a population of 363.

== Geography ==
According to the U.S. Census Bureau, the town has a total area of 0.5 square miles (1.3 km^{2}), all land.

== History ==
Sipsey was founded in the early 1912-13 as a company town for the DeBardeleben Coal Company, founded by coal magnates Henry T. DeBardeleben, Milton Fies, and Nicholas M. Norris. The town served the company's employees in the nearby mines. The mine production began in 1913. At one point the town had as many as 900 residents. It was incorporated as a town on August 14, 1965.

== Demographics ==
Historical population
Census	Pop.	Note	%±
1970	608		—
1980	678		11.5%
1990	568		−16.2%
2000	552		−2.8%
2010	437		−20.8%
2020	363		−16.9%
U.S. Decennial Census; 2013 Estimate

As of the census of 2000, there were 552 people, 212 households, and 149 families residing in the town. The population density was 1,124.5 inhabitants per square mile (434.2/km^{2}). There were 239 housing units at an average density of 486.9 per square mile (188.0/km^{2}). The racial makeup of the town was 68.12% White, 31.34% Black or African American, 0.18% Native American, 0.18% from other races, and 0.18% from two or more races. 0.18% of the population were Hispanic or Latino of any race.

There were 212 households, out of which 33.0% had children under the age of 18 living with them, 50.5% were married couples living together, 16.0% had a female householder with no husband present, and 29.7% were non-families. 27.8% of all households were made up of individuals, and 11.8% had someone living alone who was 65 years of age or older. The average household size was 2.60 and the average family size was 3.19.

In the town, the population was distributed this way in terms of age — 27.2% under the age of 18, 7.8% from 18 to 24, 27.4% from 25 to 44, 24.3% from 45 to 64, and 13.4% who were 65 years of age or older. The median age was 36 years. For every 100 females, there were 94.4 males. For every 100 females age 18 and over, there were 83.6 males.

The median income for a household in the town was $23,000, and the median income for a family was $26,500. Males had a median income of $25,625 versus $20,750 for females. The per capita income for the town was $8,644. About 23.3% of families and 24.8% of the population were below the poverty line, including 26.0% of those under age 18 and 31.3% of those age 65 or over.
