= Balch & Bingham =

Law firm in Birmingham, Alabama

- Headquarters: Birmingham, Alabama
- No. of offices: 9
- No. of attorneys: 245+
- Major practice areas: General practice, Energy, Environmental, Financial Services
- Date founded: 1922
- Founder: William Logan Martin Jr
- Company type: Limited liability partnership
- Website: www.balch.com

Balch & Bingham LLP is a United States law firm based in Birmingham, Alabama.

As of 2022, Balch & Bingham was the fourth largest law firm in Birmingham. The firm has additional offices in Alabama, Florida, Georgia, Mississippi, Texas, and Washington, D.C. Primary practice areas include energy, environmental, and banking and financial services.

== History ==
The firm was founded in 1922 by William Logan Martin Jr, who served as Alabama's Attorney General between 1915-1917 and as attorney for Alabama Power Company. Martin's private practice in Birmingham was joined by Judge Fritz Thompson and Perry Turner to form Martin, Thompson & Turner in 1922.

In 1983, then known as Balch, Bingham, Baker, Hawthorne, Williams & Ward, the firm merged with Montgomery partnership Smith, Bowman, Thagard, Crook & Culpeper, expanding the firm's presence in Montgomery. In 1985, the firm's name was changed to Balch & Bingham in recognition of partners Eason Balch and John Bingham.

In 2001, the firm merged with Eaton & Cottrell in Mississippi, followed by a 2003 merger with Meadows, Ichter and Bowers in Atlanta. In April 2012, Balch & Bingham acquired Birmingham-based Presley Burton & Collier, along with Jacksonville-based Stoneburner, Berry, Gocker, Purcell & Greenhut PA later that year.

The firm acquired the assets of Duggins Wren Mann & Romero, merging the Austin energy sector law firm into Balch & Bingham, on January 1, 2026. The deal brought approximately 21 attorneys to the firm and expanded its presence in Texas, particularly in energy and infrastructure-related legal services.

== Notable representations ==
In August 2010, the firm was retained by the Governor of Georgia to conduct a special investigation into the Atlanta Public Schools cheating scandal. The report, delivered to the Governor in June 2011, uncovered cheating by over 178 administrators and teachers from 56 elementary and middle schools in the Atlanta Public School System.

Beginning in 2010, Balch & Bingham assisted the Mississippi Department of Environmental Quality in litigation against BP for environmental damages following the April 2010 Deepwater Horizon oil spill. In 2014, the firm's billing was central to litigation in which the Mississippi Department of Environmental Quality responded to a public records request by producing heavily redacted versions of invoices for expenses incurred by Balch and other subcontractors.

In March 2015, Balch & Bingham was retained by Lee May, CEO of DeKalb County, Georgia, to investigate improper spending by government officials. Led by Balch's lead investigator Richard Hyde and firm Partner Mike Bowers, formerly the Attorney General of Georgia, the firm's investigation uncovered many examples of misconduct, including stolen county property, taxpayer funded charge cards used for liquor purchases, and ignored requests for public record. May, who was himself implicated in the investigation’s findings, criticized the firm for the cost of the far reaching inquiry.

In 2019, the firm filed a lawsuit on behalf of the Mississippi Secretary of State’s office against the U.S. Army Corps of Engineers and the Mississippi River Commission. The suit alleged that these entities violated federal law by “failing to study the consequences of diverting the Mississippi River into the Mississippi Sound through the Bonnet Carré Spillway” causing ecological and economical damage.

Balch attorney Chris Anulewicz served as Georgia's special assistant attorney general in the Post-election lawsuits related to the 2020 United States presidential election from Georgia. On January 8, 2021, four of the cases were dismissed.

== Notable attorneys ==
- Mike Bowers – Attorney General of Georgia (1981–1997)
- Greg Cook – American lawyer and judge, associate justice of the Supreme Court of Alabama, (2023–present)
- Clifford Durr – American lawyer who defended activists, including Rosa Parks, during the New Deal and McCarthy eras
- Philip Gunn – Former Speaker of the Mississippi House of Representatives
- Barbara Olson – American lawyer and conservative television commentator
- Edwina Rogers – Conservative lobbyist, Executive Director of the Patient Centered Primary Care Collaborative (2006-2011) and National Economic Council Associate Director (2001-2002)
- William Sellers – American lawyer and judge, associate justice of the Supreme Court of Alabama, (2017–present)
- Alvin Vogtle – American lawyer, business executive and World War II fighter pilot
