= List of places in Alabama: I–M =

This is a list of current cities, towns, unincorporated communities, counties, and other recognized places in the U.S. state of Alabama, with information on the number of counties in which the place lies, the name of its principal county, and its lower and upper ZIP Code bounds, if applicable.

== See also ==
- Alabama
- List of cities in Alabama
- List of counties in Alabama

== I ==
Name of place	Number of counties	Principal county	Lower zip code	Upper zip code
Idaho	1	Clay County	36251	
Ider	1	DeKalb County	35981	
Independence	1	Autauga County	36003	
Indian Creek	1	Bullock County	36061	
Indian Hill	1	Talladega County	35044	
Indian Hills	1	Shelby County	35244	
Indian Springs	1	Choctaw County		
Indian Springs	1	Lauderdale County	35633	
Indian Springs Village	1	Shelby County		
Indian Valley	1	Shelby County	35244	
Industrial City	1	Jefferson County	35023	
Industry	1	Butler County	36033	
Ingate	1	Bibb County		
Inglenook	1	Jefferson County		
Ingle Terrace	1	Jefferson County		
Ingram	1	Hale County	35474	
Ingram Ford	1	Lauderdale County		
Ingram Wells	1	Calhoun County		
Inland	1	Blount County	35121	
Inland Junction	1	Blount County		
Inmanfield	1	Winston County	35540	
Ino	1	Coffee County	36453	
Institute	1	Wilcox County	36778	
Interburan Heights	1	Jefferson County	35064	
Intercourse	1	Sumter County		
Interurban Heights	1	Jefferson County		
Inverness	1	Bullock County	36089	
Inverness	1	Shelby County		
Ipco	1	Choctaw County		
Ireland Hill	1	Marion County	35565	
Ironaton	1	Talladega County	36268	
Iron City	1	Calhoun County	36203	
Irondale	1	Jefferson County	35210	
Irondale Junction	1	Jefferson County		
Irvington	1	Limestone County		
Irvington	1	Mobile County	36544	
Isabella	1	Chilton County	36750	
Isbell	1	Franklin County	35653	
Ishkooda	1	Jefferson County		
Isney	1	Choctaw County	36919	
Ivalee	1	Etowah County	35954	
Ivanhoe	1	Jefferson County		
Ivy Creek	1	Crenshaw County		

== J ==
Name of place	Number of counties	Principal county	Lower zip code	Upper zip code
Jachin	1	Choctaw County	36910	
Jack	1	Coffee County	36346	
Jackson	1	Choctaw County	36921	
Jackson	1	Clarke County	36545	
Jacksonburg	1	Lauderdale County		
Jackson Heights	1	Mobile County		
Jackson Oak	1	Baldwin County	36526	
Jackson Quarters	1	Greene County		
Jackson's Gap	1	Tallapoosa County	36861	
Jackson Spur	1	Choctaw County		
Jacksonville	1	Calhoun County	36265	
Jack Springs	1	Escambia County	36552	
Jagger	1	Walker County	35578	
Jamback	1	Bullock County		
James	1	Lee County		
Jamestown	1	Cherokee County	35973	
Jamesville	1	Lee County	36879	
Janes Mill	1	Conecuh County		
Jarrett	1	Chambers County	36854	
Jasper	1	Walker County	35501	
Java	1	Coffee County	36010	
Jeddo	1	Monroe County	36480	
Jeff	1	Madison County	35806	
Jefferson	1	Marengo County	36745	
Jefferson Hills	1	Jefferson County		
Jefferson Park	1	Jefferson County	35210	
Jemison	1	Chilton County	35085	
Jena	1	Greene County	35480	
Jenifer	1	Talladega County	36268	
Jenkins	1	Calhoun County		
Jenkins Crossroads	1	Bullock County		
Jericho	1	Jackson County		
Jericho	1	Perry County	36756	
Jernigan	1	Russell County	36851	
Jerusalem	1	Lawrence County		
Jerusalem Heights	1	Tuscaloosa County	35404	
Jester	1	Lee County		
Jet	1	Jefferson County		
Joe Wheeler Dam	1	Lawrence County	35672	
Joffre	1	Autauga County		
Johnny Ford	1	Walker County		
Johns	1	Jefferson County		
Johnson Crossroads	1	Lauderdale County		
Johnsons Crossing	1	Cullman County	35077	
Johnsons Mill	1	Marshall County		
Johnsonville	1	Conecuh County	36401	
Jones	1	Autauga County	36749	
Jones Bluff Dam	2	Autauga County		
Jones Bluff Dam	2	Lowndes County		
Jonesboro	1	Baldwin County	36526	
Jonesboro	1	Franklin County	35653	
Jonesboro	1	Jefferson County	35023	
Jones Chapel	1	Cullman County	35055	
Jones Crossroads	1	Houston County		
Jones Crossroads	1	Limestone County	35611	
Jones Mill	1	Chambers County		
Jones Valley	1	Jefferson County		
Jones Valley Estates	1	Madison County		
Jonesville	1	Pike County		
Joppa	1	Cullman County	35087	
Joquin	1	Crenshaw County	36035	
Joquin	1	Pike County	36035	
Jordan	1	Elmore County	36092	
Jordan	1	Washington County	36518	
Jordans Mill	1	Franklin County	35593	
Josephine	1	Baldwin County	36530	
Joseph Springs	1	Calhoun County	36203	
Josie	1	Pike County	36005	
Joy	1	Blount County		
Judson	1	Chambers County		
Jumbo	1	Chilton County		

== K ==
Name of place	Number of counties	Principal county	Lower zip code	Upper zip code
Kahatchie	1	Talladega County		
Kalona	1	Chilton County		
Kansas	1	Walker County	35573	
Kaolin	1	DeKalb County		
Kaolin	1	Russell County	36867	
Kaulton	1	Tuscaloosa County	35404	
Keego	1	Escambia County	36426	
Keener	1	Etowah County	35954	
Keith	1	DeKalb County		
Keith	1	Monroe County		
Kellerman	1	Tuscaloosa County	35468	
Kelly	1	Dale County	36322	
Kellys Crossroads	1	Coosa County		
Kellys Crossroads	1	Geneva County		
Kelly Springs	1	Houston County	36301	
Kellyton	1	Coosa County	35089	
Kendale Gardens	1	Lauderdale County	35633	
Kendall Crossroads	1	Chambers County		
Kennamer Cove	1	Marshall County		
Kennedy	1	Lamar County	35574	
Kent	1	Elmore County	36045	
Kent	1	Pike County	36035	
Kentuck	1	Talladega County		
Kenwood	1	Jefferson County	35216	
Kershaw	1	Walker County		
Ketona	1	Jefferson County	35217	
Kewahatchie	1	Shelby County		
Key	1	Cherokee County	35960	
Keyno	1	Coosa County		
Keysburg	1	Etowah County		
Keys Mill	1	Madison County	35761	
Keystone	1	Shelby County	35007	
Keyton	1	Coffee County	36330	
Keytons	1	Houston County		
Kilby	1	Montgomery County		
Kilgore	1	Jefferson County		
Killen	1	Lauderdale County	35645	
Killian Mill	1	DeKalb County		
Killough Springs	1	Jefferson County		
Kilpatrick	1	DeKalb County	35950	
Kimberly	1	Jefferson County	35091	
Kimbrell	1	Jefferson County	35111	
Kimbrough	1	Wilcox County	36746	
Kimbrough Crossroads	1	Lauderdale County		
Kincheon	1	Chilton County	35045	
Kingdom Crossroads	1	Shelby County		
Kings Landing	1	Dallas County	36775	
Kings Mill	1	Walker County		
Kingston	1	Autauga County		
Kingston	1	Jefferson County		
Kingsway Terrace	1	Jefferson County		
Kingtown	1	Lauderdale County	35652	
Kingville	1	Lamar County	35574	
Kinsey	1	Houston County	36303	
Kinston	1	Coffee County	36453	
Kinterbish	1	Sumter County	36907	
Kiowa	1	Blount County		
Kirbytown	1	Marshall County	35755	
Kirk	1	Pickens County	35466	
Kirkland	1	Escambia County	36426	
Kirklands Crossroads	1	Henry County	36345	
Kirks Grove	1	Cherokee County	30124	
Klein	1	Shelby County	35078	
Klondike	1	Walker County	35580	
Knightens Crossroads	1	Calhoun County	36272	
Knoxville	1	Greene County	35469	
Koenton	1	Washington County	36558	
Koppers	1	Escambia County		
Kowaliga	1	Elmore County		
Kowaliga Beach	1	Elmore County	35010	
Krafton	1	Mobile County	36610	
Kushla	1	Mobile County		
Kyles	1	Jackson County	35746	
Kymulga	1	Talladega County	35014	

== L ==
Name of place	Number of counties	Principal county	Lower zip code	Upper zip code
Labuco	1	Jefferson County		
Laceys Chapel	1	Jefferson County	35023	
Lacey's Spring	1	Morgan County	35754	
Lacon	1	Morgan County	35622	
Ladiga	1	Calhoun County	36272	
Ladonia	1	Russell County	36867	
LaFayette	1	Chambers County	36862	
Lagoon Park	1	Montgomery County	36117	
Lake Coves	1	Lauderdale County	35633	
Lake Drive Estates	1	Jefferson County	35229	
Lake Forest	1	Baldwin County	36526	
Lake Highlands	1	Jefferson County		
Lake Howard	1	DeKalb County		
Lake Purdy	1	Shelby County		
Lake Shore Estates	1	Jefferson County	35229	
Lakeside Acres	1	Lauderdale County	35645	
Lakeside Highlands	1	Lauderdale County	35633	
Lakeview	1	Colbert County		
Lakeview	1	DeKalb County	35971	
Lakeview	1	Lawrence County		
Lakeview	1	Marshall County	35976	
Lake View	1	Tuscaloosa County	35111	
Lakeview Estates	1	Jefferson County	35229	
Lakeview Highlands	1	Colbert County	35661	
Lakeview Park	1	Jefferson County	35229	
Lakewood	1	DeKalb County		
Lakewood	1	Jefferson County		
Lakewood	1	Limestone County	35611	
Lakewood	1	Madison County		
Lakewood Estate	1	Jefferson County	35023	
Lakewood Hills	1	Jefferson County		
Lamar	1	Randolph County		
Lamison	1	Wilcox County	36747	
Land	1	Choctaw County	36904	
Landersville	1	Lawrence County	35650	
Landmark	1	Shelby County		
Lands Crossroads	1	DeKalb County	35986	
Lane	1	Marshall County		
Lane Springs	1	Colbert County	35616	
Lanett	1	Chambers County	36863	
Laneville	1	Hale County		
Laneville	1	Lowndes County		
Laney	1	Calhoun County		
Langdale	1	Chambers County	36854	
Langston	1	Jackson County	35755	
Langston Ford	1	Shelby County		
Langtown	1	Lawrence County	35618	
Laniers	1	Talladega County	35014	
Lapine	1	Crenshaw County	36041	
Lapine	1	Montgomery County	36046	
La Place	1	Macon County	36075	
Lardent	1	Calhoun County	36203	
Larkin	1	Jackson County		
Larkinsville	1	Jackson County	35768	
Larkwood	1	Jefferson County	35215	
Lasca	1	Marengo County	36784	
Latham	1	Baldwin County	36579	
Lathamville	1	DeKalb County	35962	
Lathrop	1	Pickens County		
Lato	1	Russell County		
Lattiwood	1	Marshall County	35950	
Lauderdale Beach	1	Lauderdale County	35633	
Laurendine	1	Mobile County	36582	
Lavaca	1	Choctaw County	36911	
Lawley	1	Bibb County	36793	
Lawley	1	Shelby County		
Lawngate	1	Limestone County		
Lawrence	1	Cherokee County	35959	
Lawrence Cove	1	Morgan County	35621	
Lawrence Mill	1	Fayette County	35555	
Lawrenceville	1	Henry County	36310	
Lawson	1	Limestone County		
Lawson Ford	1	DeKalb County		
Lawsontown	1	Jefferson County		
Lay Springs	1	Etowah County		
Leatherwood	1	Calhoun County	36203	
Lebanon	1	Cleburne County	36269	
Lebanon	1	DeKalb County	35961	
Lecta	1	Cleburne County	36264	
Ledbetters	1	Talladega County		
Lee Crossroads	1	Randolph County		
Leeds	3	Jefferson County	35094	
Leeds	3	St. Clair County	35094	
Leeds	3	Shelby County	35094	
Leeds Mineral Well	1	Jefferson County	35094	
Leesburg	1	Cherokee County	35983	
Leesdale	1	Morgan County	35622	
Leespeer	1	Walker County		
Leggtown	1	Limestone County	35620	
Le Grand	1	Montgomery County		
Lehigh	1	Blount County		
Leighton	1	Colbert County	35646	
Lemoyne	1	Mobile County	36505	
Lenlock	1	Calhoun County	36203	
Lennon Hill	1	Lawrence County		
Lenox	1	Conecuh County	36454	
Lentzville	1	Limestone County		
Leola	1	Lawrence County		
Leon	1	Crenshaw County	36028	
Leonard	1	Cherokee County		
Leroy	1	Washington County	36548	
Leslie	1	Chilton County	36790	
Lester	1	Limestone County	35647	
Letcher	1	Jackson County	35776	
Letchers	1	Calhoun County	36203	
Letohatchee	1	Lowndes County	36047	
Letohatchie	1	Lowndes County		
Letson Settlement	1	Lawrence County		
Level Plains	1	Dale County	36322	
Level Plains Crossroads	1	Dale County		
Levelroad	1	Randolph County	36276	
Levert	1	Perry County	36779	
Lewis	1	Dale County	36350	
Lewisburg	1	Jefferson County		
Lewiston	1	Greene County	35462	
Lexington	1	Lauderdale County	35648	
Leydens Mill	1	Calhoun County		
Liberty	1	Blount County	35031	
Liberty	1	Butler County	36067	
Liberty	1	DeKalb County	35957	
Liberty	1	Pickens County	35461	
Liberty City	2	Macon County	36866	
Liberty City	2	Tallapoosa County	36866	
Liberty Crossroads	1	Chambers County		
Liberty Highlands	1	Jefferson County	35210	
Liberty Hill	1	Cleburne County		
Liberty Hill	1	Franklin County	35581	
Liberty Hill	1	Jackson County		
Libertyville	1	Covington County	36420	
Light	1	Geneva County		
Lightwood	1	Elmore County	36022	
Ligon Springs	1	Colbert County	35654	
Lilita	1	Sumter County		
Lillian	1	Baldwin County	36549	
Lily Flagg	1	Madison County		
Lime	1	Randolph County	36274	
Lime Kiln	1	Colbert County	35616	
Lime Rock	1	Colbert County		
Lime Sink	1	Barbour County		
Limestone	1	Monroe County	36460	
Lim Rock	1	Jackson County	35776	
Lincoln	1	Madison County		
Lincoln	1	Talladega County	35096	
Lincoln Park	1	Tuscaloosa County	35404	
Lincoya Estates	1	Jefferson County	35216	
Lindbergh	1	Jefferson County	35073	
Linde	1	Madison County		
Linden	1	Marengo County	36748	
Lindsey	1	Barbour County		
Lineville	1	Clay County	36266	
Linn Crossing	1	Jefferson County	35073	
Linton	1	Jefferson County		
Linwood	1	Pike County	36081	
Lipscomb	1	Jefferson County	35023	
Lipsy	1	Talladega County		
Lisman	1	Choctaw County	36912	
Listerhill	1	Colbert County		
Little Nashville	1	Jackson County		
Little New York	1	Marshall County		
Little Oak	1	Pike County	36081	
Little River	1	Baldwin County	36550	
Little River	1	Cherokee County	35959	
Little Rock	1	Escambia County	36502	
Little Shawmut	1	Chambers County	36863	
Little Shoal	1	Jefferson County		
Little Texas	1	Macon County	36083	
Littleton	1	Etowah County	35954	
Littleton	1	Jefferson County	35073	
Littleville	1	Colbert County	35653	
Littleville	1	Winston County	35565	
Little Walker	1	Choctaw County		
Little Warrior	1	Blount County		
Live Oak	1	Crenshaw County		
Liverpool	1	Macon County		
Livingston	1	Sumter County	35470	
Lizzieville	1	Greene County		
Lloyds	1	Mobile County		
Loachapoka	1	Lee County	36865	
Loango	1	Covington County	36474	
Locke Crossroads	1	Limestone County	35620	
Lock Five	1	Hale County		
Lockhart	1	Covington County	36455	
Lock Six	1	Lauderdale County	35645	
Lock Three	1	Lauderdale County	35652	
Locust Fork	1	Blount County	35097	
Loflin	1	Russell County		
Logan	1	Cullman County	35098	
Logan	1	Lowndes County		
Logan Martin Dam	2	Lauderdale County		
Logan Martin Dam	2	St. Clair County		
Logton	1	Pike County	36081	
Lois Spring	1	Pickens County		
Lola City	1	Jefferson County	35174	
Lomax	1	Chilton County	35045	
London	1	Conecuh County	36432	
London	1	Montgomery County	36064	
London	1	St. Clair County	35054	
Long Island	1	Jackson County	35958	
Longleaf Estates	1	Morgan County		
Longview	1	Cullman County	35179	
Longview	1	Shelby County	35137	
Longwood	1	Madison County		
Loop	1	Cherokee County	35959	
Loop	1	Mobile County	36660	
Loosier	1	Lawrence County		
Loper	1	Washington County		
Loree	1	Conecuh County	36401	
Loretto	1	Cullman County		
Lorton	1	Walker County		
Lottie	1	Baldwin County	36502	
Lou	1	Choctaw County		
Louina	1	Randolph County		
Louisville	1	Barbour County	36048	
Love Hill	1	Houston County		
Lovelace Crossroads	1	Lauderdale County	35633	
Loveless	1	DeKalb County	35967	
Loveless Park	1	Jefferson County	35023	
Lovick	1	Jefferson County	35173	
Lower Peach Tree	1	Wilcox County	36751	
Lowery	1	Geneva County	36453	
Lowerytown	1	Bibb County		
Lowetown	1	Jefferson County		
Low Gap	1	St. Clair County	35120	
Lowndesboro	1	Lowndes County	36752	
Lowrimores Crossroads	1	Calhoun County		
Lowry Mill	1	Coffee County	36346	
Loxley	1	Baldwin County	36551	
Loyola Villa	1	Baldwin County		
Lubbub	1	Pickens County		
Lucille	1	Bibb County	35184	
Lucy	1	Houston County		
Lugo	1	Barbour County	36027	
Luke	1	Etowah County		
Lum	1	Lowndes County		
Lumbull	1	Marion County	35543	
Lupton	1	Walker County		
Luttrell	1	DeKalb County	35971	
Luverne	1	Crenshaw County	36049	
Lydia	1	DeKalb County	35967	
Lyeffion	1	Conecuh County	36401	
Lyle	1	Coosa County		
Lynn	1	Winston County	35575	
Lynn Acres	1	Jefferson County		
Lynn Crossing	1	Jefferson County	35073	
Lynndale	1	Montgomery County		
Lynn Haven	1	Tuscaloosa County	35404	
Lynns Park	1	Walker County	35550	
Lynntown	1	Morgan County		
Lytle	1	Geneva County	36477	

== M ==
Name of place	Number of counties	Principal county	Lower zip code	Upper zip code
Maben	1	Jefferson County		
Mabson	1	Dale County	36360	
McAddry	1	Jefferson County		
McAding	1	Talladega County		
McAdory	1	Jefferson County		
McBrydes	1	Wilcox County		
McCainville	1	Sumter County		
McCaleb Mill	1	Madison County		
McCalla	1	Jefferson County	35111	
McClure	1	Greene County		
McClure Town	1	Pike County	36081	
McCollum	1	Walker County		
McCombs	1	Jefferson County		
McCord Crossroads	1	Cherokee County		
McCosh Mill	1	Chambers County		
McCrary	1	Pickens County		
McCrory Village	1	Tuscaloosa County	35476	
McCulley	1	Bibb County		
McCulley Hill	1	Bibb County	35184	
McCulloh	1	Lee County		
McCullough	1	Escambia County	36502	
McCullum	1	Walker County	35501	
McDade	1	Montgomery County		
McDonald Chapel	1	Jefferson County	35224	
McDowell	1	Sumter County	35450	
Macedonia	1	Cleburne County	36273	
Macedonia	1	Jackson County	35771	
Macedonia	1	Lowndes County		
Macedonia	1	Montgomery County	36069	
Macedonia	1	Pickens County	35461	
Macedonia	1	Walker County	35501	
McElderry	1	Talladega County	36268	
McEntyre	1	Clarke County		
McFarland	1	Tuscaloosa County	35405	
McFrey Crossroads	1	Cherokee County		
McGee Town	1	Lauderdale County		
McGehees	1	Montgomery County		
McGhee	1	Cherokee County		
McGhees Bend	1	Cherokee County	35960	
McGinty	1	Chambers County	36872	
McGuire Ford	1	Bibb County		
MaChis Lower Creek	1	Coffee County		
McIntosh	1	Washington County	36553	
McKenzie	2	Butler County	36456	
McKenzie	2	Conecuh County	36456	
McKestes	1	DeKalb County	35963	
Mackey	1	Cherokee County		
Mackies	1	Mobile County		
McKinley	1	Marengo County	36743	
McLarty	1	Blount County	35980	
McLendon	1	Russell County	36851	
MacMillan	1	Wilcox County		
McMullen	1	Pickens County	35442	
Macon	1	Calhoun County	36271	
McQueen	1	Autauga County		
McRae	1	Covington County		
McRitchie Mill	1	Lee County		
McShan	1	Pickens County	35471	
McVay	1	Clarke County	36451	
McVille	1	Marshall County	35950	
McWilliams	1	Wilcox County	36753	
Madison	1	Jefferson County		
Madison	2	Limestone County	35758	
Madison	2	Madison County	35758	
Madison	1	Montgomery County	36110	
Madison Crossroads	1	Madison County	35772	
Madison Heights	1	Madison County		
Madison Park	1	Montgomery County		
Madrid	1	Houston County	36320	
Magazine	1	Mobile County	36610	
Magazine Point	1	Mobile County		
Magella	1	Jefferson County		
Magnolia	1	Marengo County	36754	
Magnolia Beach	1	Baldwin County	36532	
Magnolia Courts	1	Jefferson County		
Magnolia Shores	1	Crenshaw County		
Magnolia Springs	1	Baldwin County	36555	
Magnolia Terminal	1	Marengo County	36722	
Mahan Crossroads	1	DeKalb County		
Mahlep	1	Calhoun County		
Mahrt	1	Russell County		
Majestic	1	Jefferson County	35116	
Malbis	1	Baldwin County	36526	
Malcolm	1	Washington County	36556	
Malone	1	Colbert County		
Malone	1	Randolph County	36278	
Malta	1	Escambia County	36502	
Malvern	1	Geneva County	36349	
Mamie	1	Montgomery County	36052	
Manack	1	Lowndes County	36725	
Manchester	1	Marshall County		
Manchester	1	Walker County	35501	
Manila	1	Clarke County	36586	
Manila	1	Dallas County		
Manistee	1	Monroe County		
Manley Crossroads	1	Madison County	35758	
Mann	1	Mobile County		
Manningham	1	Butler County	36037	
Mansion View	1	Lauderdale County	35633	
Mantua	1	Greene County	35462	
Maple Ford	1	Marshall County		
Maple Forks	1	Cullman County		
Maple Grove	1	Cherokee County		
Maple Hill	1	Madison County	38449	
Maplesville	1	Chilton County	36750	
Maplewood	1	Jefferson County	35094	
Maplewood	1	Madison County		
Marble City Heights	1	Talladega County	35150	
Marble Valley	1	Coosa County	35150	
Marbury	1	Autauga County	36051	
Marcoot	1	Chambers County	36862	
Mardisville	1	Talladega County		
Maremont	1	Randolph County		
Marengo	1	Marengo County		
Margaret	1	St. Clair County	35112	
Margerum	1	Colbert County	35616	
Marietta	1	Walker County	35579	
Marigold	1	Walker County		
Marion	1	Perry County	36756	
Marion Junction	1	Dallas County	36759	
Markeeta	1	St. Clair County	35094	
Marks Village	1	Jefferson County		
Markton	1	Etowah County		
Marl	1	Geneva County	36477	
Marley Mill	1	Dale County	36360	
Marlow	1	Baldwin County	36580	
Marshall	1	Dallas County		
Marshall	1	Marshall County		
Marshall Space Flight Center	1	Madison County	35812	
Mars Hill	1	Chilton County		
Mars Hill	1	Lauderdale County	35633	
Martin	1	Dallas County		
Martin Air National Guard Station	1	Etowah County	35954	
Martins	1	Jefferson County		
Martins Mill	1	Talladega County		
Martintown	1	Jackson County	35752	
Martintown	1	Winston County		
Martinville	1	Escambia County	36502	
Martling	1	Marshall County	35950	
Marvel	1	Bibb County	35115	
Marvyn	1	Lee County	36801	
Mary	1	Tallapoosa County		
Marylee	1	Walker County	35501	
Maryville	1	Etowah County	35954	
Masena	1	Bibb County		
Mashville	1	Butler County		
Mason City	1	Jefferson County		
Massey	1	Morgan County	35619	
Masseyline	1	Jefferson County		
Massillon	1	Dallas County		
Masterson Mill	1	Lawrence County	35650	
Mathews	1	Montgomery County	36052	
Mattawana	1	Blount County	35121	
Matthews	1	Montgomery County		
Maud	1	Bibb County		
Maud	1	Colbert County	35616	
Mauvilla	1	Mobile County		
Maxine	1	Jefferson County	35130	
Maxwell	1	Tuscaloosa County	35404	
Maxwell Air Force Base	1	Montgomery County	36113	
Maxwellborn	1	Calhoun County	36272	
Maxwell Field	1	Montgomery County		
Maxwell Heights	1	Montgomery County		
Mayes Crossroad	1	Etowah County		
Mayfair	1	Jefferson County	35229	
Mayfair	1	Madison County		
Maylene	1	Shelby County	35114	
Maynard Cove	1	Jackson County	35768	
Mays Crossroads	1	Clarke County		
Maysville	1	Madison County	35748	
Maytown	1	Jefferson County	35118	
Meadowbrook	1	Shelby County		
Meadow Hills	1	Madison County		
Meadowood	1	Marshall County		
Meadows Crossroads	1	Lee County		
Meadows Mill	1	Lee County		
Meadville	1	Montgomery County		
Meadwood Heights	1	Jefferson County		
Mechanicsville	1	Lee County		
Mechlin	1	Mobile County		
Media	1	Jefferson County		
Meeksville	1	Pike County		
Megargel	1	Monroe County	36457	
Mehaffey	1	Washington County		
Mehama	1	Lawrence County	35653	
Mellow Valley	1	Clay County	36255	
Melrose	1	Calhoun County		
Melrose	1	Conecuh County	36401	
Melrose	1	Pickens County	35471	
Melton	1	Hale County	36776	
Meltonsville	1	Marshall County	35755	
Melville	1	Winston County	35541	
Melvin	1	Choctaw County	36913	
Memphis	1	Pickens County	39353	
Mentone	1	DeKalb County	35984	
Mercury	1	Madison County	35743	
Meridianville	1	Madison County	35759	
Merrellton	1	Calhoun County		
Merrill Mill	1	Crenshaw County		
Merrimack	1	Madison County		
Merritts Crossroads	1	Houston County		
Merriwether	1	Greene County		
Merry	1	Montgomery County	36064	
Mertz	1	Bibb County		
Mertz	1	Mobile County		
Mexboro	1	Monroe County	36445	
Mexia	1	Monroe County	36458	
Mexia Crossing	1	Monroe County	36458	
Micaville	1	Cleburne County	36264	
Middle Brooks Crossroads	1	Lee County	36879	
Middleton	1	Calhoun County	36271	
Midfield	1	Jefferson County	35228	
Midland City	1	Dale County	36350	
Midway	1	Bullock County	36053	
Midway	1	Butler County	36042	
Midway	1	Chilton County	36056	
Midway	1	Clarke County		
Midway	1	Clay County	35072	
Midway	1	Colbert County		
Midway	1	Lawrence County	35650	
Midway	1	Monroe County	36768	
Midway	1	Wilcox County		
Miflin	1	Baldwin County	36530	
Mignon	1	Talladega County	35150	
Mikes	1	Escambia County		
Miles	1	Escambia County		
Miles	1	Jefferson County	35064	
Milk Springs	1	Colbert County		
Millbrook	2	Elmore County	36054	
Millbrook	2	Autauga County	36054	
Miller	1	Greene County		
Miller	1	Henry County		
Miller	1	Marengo County	36748	
Millers Ferry	1	Wilcox County	36760	
Millers Ford	1	Barbour County		
Millertown	1	Mobile County		
Millerville	1	Clay County	36267	
Million Dollar Lake Estates	1	Tuscaloosa County		
Millport	1	Lamar County	35576	
Millry	1	Washington County	36558	
Mills Spur	1	Tuscaloosa County		
Milltown	1	Chambers County	36862	
Mill Village	1	Marshall County	35976	
Millville	1	Sumter County		
Milner	1	Randolph County		
Milstead	1	Macon County	36075	
Milton	1	Autauga County	36749	
Mims	1	Jefferson County		
Mineola	1	Monroe County	36480	
Mineral Springs	1	Chilton County	35085	
Mineral Springs	1	Jefferson County		
Minooka	1	Chilton County	35040	
Minor	1	Jefferson County	35224	
Minor Terrace	1	Talladega County	35044	
Minter	1	Dallas County	36761	
Minters	1	Dallas County		
Mint Spring	1	Madison County		
Minvale	1	DeKalb County	35967	
Mitchell	1	Bullock County	36029	
Mitchell Crossroads	1	Lee County		
Mitchelltown	1	Lauderdale County	35645	
Mitylene	1	Montgomery County		
Mixonville	1	Conecuh County		
Mobile	1	Mobile County	36601	99
Mobile Coast Guard Base	1	Mobile County		
Mobile Municipal Airport	1	Mobile County		
Moffat	1	Bibb County		
Moffet	1	Mobile County	36587	
Moffits Mill	1	Lee County		
Molder	1	Madison County	35748	
Mollie	1	Choctaw County	36912	
Molloy	1	Lamar County	35586	
Mon Louis	1	Mobile County	36523	
Monmouth	1	Jefferson County		
Monroeton	1	Monroe County		
Monroeville	1	Monroe County	36460	
Monrovia	1	Madison County	35806	
Montague	1	Jackson County	35740	
Monterey	1	Butler County	36030	
Monterey Heights	1	Lee County		
Monte-Sano	1	Jefferson County		
Montevallo	1	Shelby County	35115	
Monte Vista	1	Etowah County	35901	
Montgomery	1	Montgomery County	36101	99
Monticello	1	Pike County	36005	
Montrose	1	Baldwin County	36559	
Moody	1	St. Clair County	35004	
Moody Ford	1	Lauderdale County		
Moodys Crossroads	1	Crenshaw County		
Moontown	1	Madison County		
Moore Corner	1	Jefferson County		
Moorefield	1	Chambers County	36862	
Moores Bridge	1	Tuscaloosa County	35458	
Moores Crossroad	1	DeKalb County	35971	
Moores Crossroads	1	Randolph County	36274	
Moores Mill	1	Madison County	35811	
Moores Valley	1	Marengo County		
Mooresville	1	Limestone County	35649	
Moore Town	1	Sumter County		
Moragne	1	Etowah County		
Moreland	1	Winston County	35572	
Morgan	1	Jefferson County	35023	
Morgan City	1	Morgan County	35754	
Morgans Crossroads	1	Etowah County		
Morgan Springs	1	Perry County		
Morganville	1	Lowndes County		
Moriah	1	Coosa County	35136	
Morningside	1	Jefferson County	35215	
Morris	1	Jefferson County	35116	
Morris Crossroads	1	Limestone County		
Morris Mill	1	Jackson County		
Morrison Crossroads	1	Randolph County		
Morrisville	1	Calhoun County		
Morrows Grove	1	Greene County		
Morvin	1	Clarke County	36762	
Moscow	1	Lamar County		
Moscow	1	Marengo County		
Moshat	1	Cherokee County	35960	
Mossboro	1	Shelby County		
Mosses	1	Lowndes County	36518	
Mossy Grove	1	Pike County	36081	
Mostellers	1	Shelby County	35143	
Motley	1	Clay County	36276	
Motts	1	Lee County		
Moulton	1	Lawrence County	35650	
Moulton Heights	1	Morgan County	35601	
Moundville	2	Hale County	35474	
Moundville	2	Tuscaloosa County	35474	
Mountainboro	1	Etowah County	35957	
Mountain Brook	1	Jefferson County	35223	
Mountain Brook	1	Madison County		
Mountain Brook Village	1	Jefferson County	35223	
Mountain Chest	1	Marshall County	35976	
Mountain Creek	1	Chilton County	36056	
Mountaindale	1	Jefferson County		
Mountain Grove	1	Blount County	35031	
Mountain Home	1	Lawrence County	35618	
Mountain Mills	1	Colbert County		
Mountain Park	1	Jefferson County		
Mountain Star	1	Franklin County		
Mountain View	1	Marshall County	35976	
Mountain Woods	1	Jefferson County		
Mountain Woods Park	1	Jefferson County	35216	
Mount Andrew	1	Barbour County	36053	
Mount Andrew	1	Macon County		
Mount Carmel	1	Jackson County	35740	
Mount Carmel	1	Madison County		
Mount Carmel	1	Marshall County	35976	
Mount Carmel	1	Montgomery County	36046	
Mount Hebron	1	Greene County	35443	
Mount Hebron	1	Marshall County	35957	
Mount Hester	1	Colbert County	35616	
Mount Hope	1	Lawrence County	35651	
Mount Hope	1	Walker County		
Mount Ida	1	Crenshaw County	36009	
Mount Jefferson	1	Lee County	36801	
Mount Lebanon	1	Madison County		
Mount Meigs	1	Montgomery County	36057	
Mount Moriah	1	Lawrence County		
Mount Nebo	1	Dallas County	36785	
Mount Olive	1	Blount County		
Mount Olive	1	Butler County		
Mount Olive	1	Coosa County	35072	
Mount Olive	1	DeKalb County		
Mount Olive	1	Jefferson County	35117	
Mount Olive	1	Marshall County		
Mount Pinson	1	Jefferson County		
Mount Pleasant	1	Coffee County	36330	
Mount Pleasant	1	Monroe County	36480	
Mount Rozell	1	Limestone County	35647	
Mount Sharon	1	Talladega County		
Mount Sinai	1	Autauga County		
Mount Star	1	Franklin County	35653	
Mount Sterling	1	Choctaw County	36904	
Mount Tabor	1	Morgan County		
Mount Union	1	Conecuh County	36401	
Mount Vernon	1	Cullman County	35179	
Mount Vernon	1	DeKalb County	35967	
Mount Vernon	1	Fayette County	35555	
Mount Vernon	1	Mobile County	36560	
Mount View	1	Cullman County		
Mount Willing	1	Lowndes County	36032	
Mount Zion	1	Montgomery County	36069	
Movico	1	Mobile County		
MOWA Choctaw	2	Mobile County		
MOWA Choctaw	2	Washington County		
Muck City	1	Lawrence County		
Mud Creek	1	Jackson County	35752	
Mud Creek	1	Jefferson County	35006	
Mulberry	1	Autauga County	36003	
Mulberry	1	Chilton County		
Mulberry	1	Crenshaw County		
Mulga	1	Jefferson County	35118	
Mulga Mine	1	Jefferson County	35118	
Mullins	1	Houston County		
Munford	1	Talladega County	36268	
Munk City	1	Lawrence County	35650	
Murphree Place	1	Limestone County		
Murphree Valley	1	Blount County		
Murphy	1	Lauderdale County	35677	
Murphy Cross Roads	1	Lauderdale County		
Murphy Ford	1	Blount County		
Murrays Chapel	1	St. Clair County	35146	
Murrycross	1	Etowah County		
Muscadine	1	Cleburne County	36269	
Muscadine Junction	1	Cleburne County	36269	
Muscle Shoals	1	Colbert County	35661	
Muscle Shoals Airport	1	Colbert County	35661	
Muscoda	1	Jefferson County	35023	
Mynot	1	Colbert County	35616	
Myrtle	1	Montgomery County		
Myrtlewood	1	Marengo County	36763	
