= Alabama State Route 146 =

State highway in Alabama, United States

State Route 146

Route information
- Maintained by ALDOT
- Length: 6.334 mi (10.194 km)
- Existed: 1965–present

Major junctions
- West end: SR 65 at Swaim
- East end: SR 79 near Skyline

Location
- Country: United States
- State: Alabama
- Counties: Jackson County

Highway system
- Alabama State Highway System; Interstate; US; State
← SR 145	→ SR 147

State Route 146 (SR 146) is a 6.334-mile-long (10.194 km) state highway that exists entirely within Jackson County in the northeastern part of the U.S. state of Alabama. The western terminus of the highway is at an intersection with SR 65 in Swaim, an unincorporated community. The eastern terminus of the highway is at an intersection with SR 79 between Skyline and Hytop.

== History ==
For a brief period in the late 1940s, a state route designated State Route 146 existed in Jefferson County, Alabama. The route was established some time between 1946 and 1947, and was discontinued some time between 1949 and 1951. The route began in Irondale at the intersection of State Route 4 and Georgia Road, following Georgia Road to 1st Avenue South, then following 1st Avenue South to 57th Street North, then on 57th Street North, terminating at US 11 in Woodlawn.

== Route description ==
SR 146 begins at an intersection with SR 65 in Swaim. It travels to the south-southeast and almost immediately intersects the southern terminus of Jackson County Route 9 (CR 9). It curves to the southeast and crosses over Paint Rock River. Right after the river are intersections with the southern terminus of Jackson CR 516 and the eastern terminus of Jackson CR 142 in quick succession. The highway proceeds to climb over 1000 feet in the course of two miles. The highway curves to the east and travels just south of Baileytown. After an intersection with Jackson CR 138, the highway curves to the northeast and crosses over Guess Creek. It curves to the east-southeast and intersects the northern terminus of Jackson CR 544 on the northwestern edge of Sanders Cemetery. It travels along the northern edge of the cemetery, crossing Mill Creek. Approximately 1,500 feet (460 m) later, SR 146 intersects the eastern terminus of Jackson CR 545. It then meets its eastern terminus, an intersection with SR 79. Here, the roadway continues as Jackson CR 107.

== Major intersections ==
The entire route is in Jackson County.

Location	mi	km	Destinations	Notes
Swaim	0.000	0.000	SR 65 – Princeton, Huntland, Tennessee	Western terminus
	6.334	10.194	SR 79 – Skyline, Hytop	Eastern terminus
1.000 mi = 1.609 km; 1.000 km = 0.621 mi
