= Williamson R. W. Cobb =

American politician (1807–1864)

Williamson Cobb
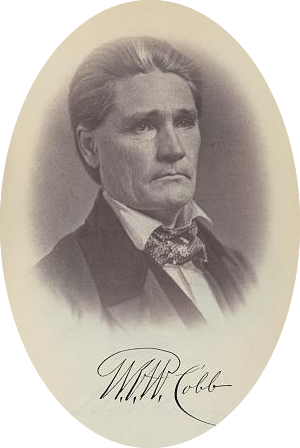

Member of the U.S. House of Representatives from Alabama's 6th district
- In office March 4, 1847 – January 30, 1861
- Preceded by: Reuben Chapman
- Succeeded by: Thomas Haughey

Personal details
- Born: June 8, 1807 Rhea County, Tennessee, U.S.
- Died: November 1, 1864 (aged 57) Bellefonte, Alabama
- Party: Democratic

Williamson Robert Winfield Cobb (June 8, 1807 – November 1, 1864) was an American politician who served the state of Alabama in the U.S. House of Representatives between 1847 and 1861.

== Biography ==
He was born in Rhea County, Tennessee on June 8, 1807, to David Cobb and Martha Bryant. He moved with his father, David Cobb, in 1809 to Bellefonte, Jackson County, Alabama. Cobb received a limited education and worked as a clock peddler and merchant in Bellefonte before being elected to the Alabama House of Representatives in 1844. In 1847 he was elected as a Democrat to the U.S. House of Representatives from Alabama's sixth congressional district, which then included Huntsville and the mountainous counties of northeast Alabama, including Cobb's home county of Jackson, carved out of Madison in 1819.

Cobb was reelected to six additional terms, consistently defeating more affluent, better educated opponents from Huntsville, including Clement Claiborne Clay, by the majority vote of the plain folk of the hill country. Despite owning slaves himself, Cobb ran on an anti-elite platform which garnered support among poor and disenfranchised people.

Cobb was a strong Unionist and opponent of secession, and when Alabama did secede in 1861, he withdrew from Congress only reluctantly. He ran unsuccessfully for the Confederate House of Representatives in 1861, but was elected to the Second Confederate Congress in 1863 amid growing antiwar sentiment. He however did not arrive to take his seat, and was subsequently expelled by a unanimous vote for his avowed Unionist sentiments. Cobb was killed by the accidental discharge of his own pistol while putting up a fence on his plantation near Bellefonte on November 1, 1864. He was buried in the family cemetery on the estate of his brother, Bryant Anderson Cobb, in neighboring Madison County.

== Expulsion by the Confederate House ==
On May 3, 1864, the Confederate House created a committee of 5 to investigate charges against Cobb. After Cobb's death, the House voted 75 to 0 in favor of expelling Cobb (November 17, 1864).

The resolution appears to have been made without knowledge, or even in spite of, Cobb's demise. It charged him with failing to claim his seat in the House, "being behind enemy lines on terms of friendly intercourse", and "manifesting his disloyalty to the Confederate States."

== Notes ==
U.S. House of Representatives
Preceded by Reuben Chapman	Member of the U.S. House of Representatives from Alabama's 6th congressional district 1847–1861	Succeeded by District inactive
