= Pleasant Groves, Alabama =

- Town
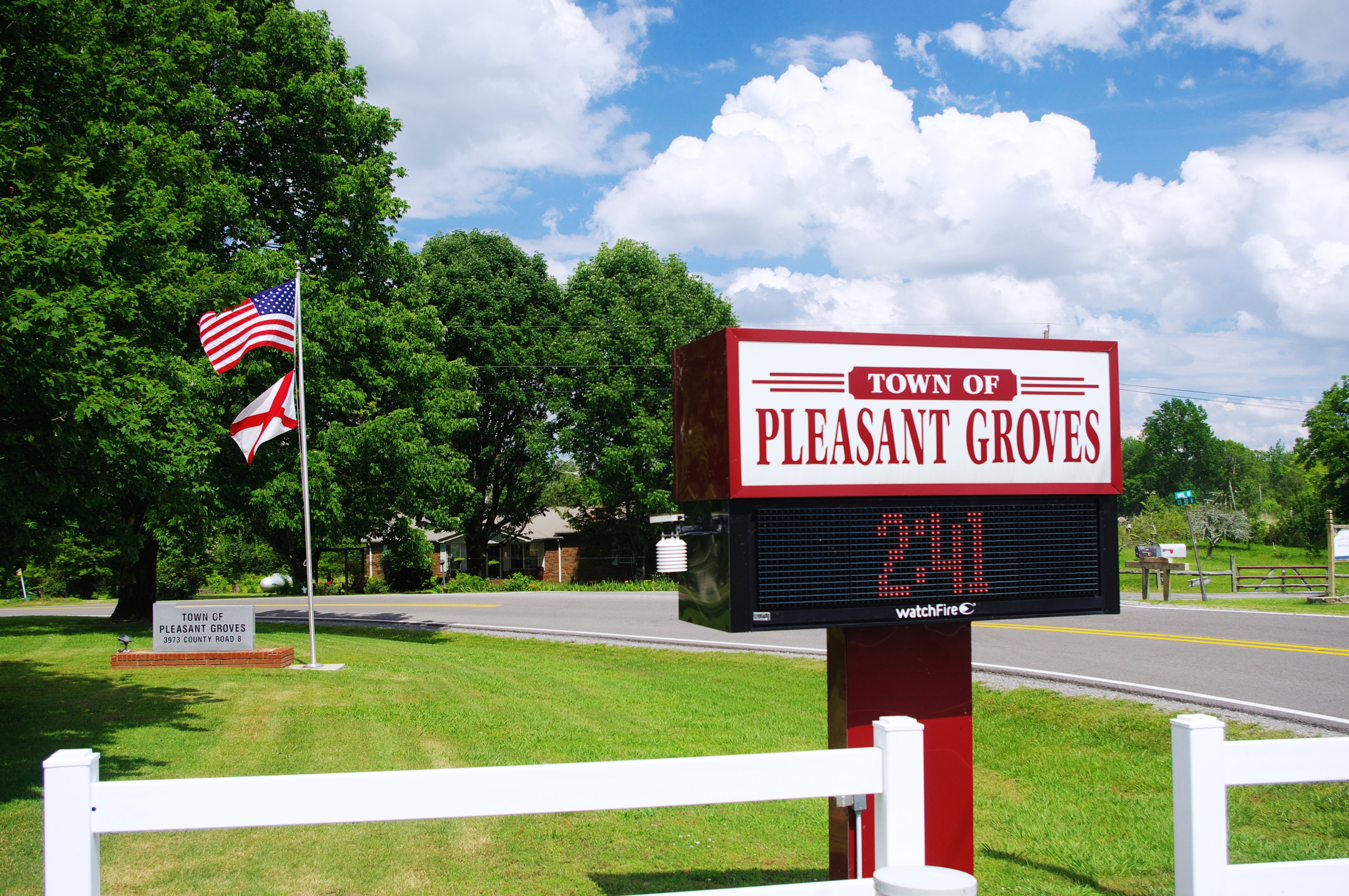
- Pleasant Groves

- Location of Pleasant Groves in Jackson County, Alabama.

- Location within the state of Alabama
- Coordinates: 34°44′29″N 86°11′26″W
- Country: United States
- State: Alabama
- County: Jackson

Area
  - Total: 3.65 sq mi (9.45 km^{2})
  - Land: 3.64 sq mi (9.44 km^{2})
  - Water: 0.0039 sq mi (0.01 km^{2})

Population (2020)
  - Total: 426
  - Density: 116.8/sq mi (45.11/km^{2})
- Time zone: UTC-6 (Central (CST))
  - Summer (DST): UTC-5 (CDT)
- FIPS code: 01-61038

Pleasant Groves is a town in Jackson County, Alabama, United States. It incorporated on February 17, 1993. As of the 2020 census, Pleasant Groves had a population of 426.

== Geography ==
Pleasant Groves is located at 34°44'29" North, 86°11'26" West (34.741295, -86.190445). The town is situated on a narrow ridge that extends outward from the Cumberland Plateau in western Jackson County. Woodville lies at the base of the plateau to the southwest, Skyline lies along the plateau to the northeast, and the Paint Rock River flows through the valley to the northwest. County Road 8 is the primary traffic artery in Pleasant Groves.

According to the U.S. Census Bureau, the town has a total area of 3.8 square miles (9.8 km^{2}), all land.

== Demographics ==
Historical population
| Census | Pop. | Note | %± |
|---|---|---|---|
| 2000 | 447 | | — |
| 2010 | 420 | | −6.0% |
| 2020 | 426 | | 1.4% |
U.S. Decennial Census; 2013 Estimate

As of the census of 2000, there were 447 people, 166 households, and 138 families residing in the town. The population density was 118.4 inhabitants per square mile (45.7/km^{2}). There were 177 housing units at an average density of 46.9 units per square mile (18.1 units/km^{2}). The racial makeup of the town was 89.04% White, 0.00% Black or African American, 5.37% Native American, 0.00% Asian, 0.00% Pacific Islander, 0.00% from other races, and 5.59% from two or more races. 0.22% of the population were Hispanic or Latino of any race.

There were 166 households, out of which 42.2% had children under the age of 18 living with them, 70.5% were married couples living together, 10.2% had a female householder with no husband present, and 16.3% were non-families. 15.1% of all households were made up of individuals, and 6.0% had someone living alone who was 65 years of age or older. The average household size was 2.69 and the average family size was 3.00.

In the town, 27.1% of the population were under the age of 18, 10.7% from 18 to 24, 28.2% from 25 to 44, 24.8% from 45 to 64, and 9.2% who were 65 years of age or older. The median age was 33 years. For every 100 females, there were 95.2 males. For every 100 females age 18 and over, there were 89.5 males.

The median income for a household in the town was $33,854, and the median income for a family was $38,056. Males had a median income of $31,705 versus $17,222 for females. The per capita income for the town was $14,251. 6.4% of the population and 5.8% of families were below the poverty line. Out of the total population, 4.0% of those under the age of 18 and 17.9% of those 65 and older were living below the poverty line.
