= Pikeville, Alabama =

Pikeville, Alabama, may refer to the following places in the U.S. state of Alabama:

- Pikeville, Jackson County, Alabama, an unincorporated community
- Pikeville, Marion County, Alabama, a ghost town
