= Jackson County School District (Alabama) =

School district in Alabama, United States

Jackson County Schools

Location
- Jackson County, Alabama United States

District information
- Type: Public
- Grades: K–12
- Superintendent: Kevin Dukes
- Schools: 17

Students and staff
- Students: 5,158 (2020–2021)
- Teachers: 270 (on FTE basis)
- Student–teacher ratio: 19.1:1

Other information
- Website: https://www.jacksonk12.org/

Jackson County School District is a school district headquartered in Hollywood, Alabama.

The district includes all parts of Jackson County except for those in the Scottsboro city limits. The district enrolls approximately 5,150 students and operates 17 schools, including five K–12 schools and one traditional high school. The superintendent is Kevin Dukes. It is one of two school districts in the county, the other being Scottsboro City Schools.

== Schools ==
There are 17 schools, including five K–12 schools:

K-12 schools

- North Sand Mountain School, Higdon
- Pisgah High School, Pisgah
- Section High School, Section
- Skyline High School, Skyline
- Woodville High School, Woodville

High schools

- Earnest Pruett Center of Technology, Hollywood
- North Jackson High School, Stevenson

Primary/elementary/K-8 schools

- Bridgeport Elementary, Bridgeport
- Bridgeport Middle, Bridgeport
- Bryant Elementary (K–6), Bryant
- Dutton Elementary (K–8), Dutton
- Flat Rock Elementary (K–8), Flat Rock
- Hollywood Elementary (K–8), Hollywood
- Macedonia Elementary (K–8), Section
- Rosalie Elementary (K–8), Rosalie
- Stevenson Elementary, Stevenson
- Stevenson Middle, Stevenson

The Kevin Dukes Career and Innovation Academy in Hollywood became the district headquarters in 2023. The district sold its previous headquarters.

== Former school ==
- Paint Rock Valley High School, Princeton – Closed in May 2018 and merged into Skyline and Woodville schools

== Programs ==
Circa 1985 the district established an alternative education program in the Material Center in Hollywood.

== See also ==
- Scottsboro City Schools
- DeKalb County School District – Located in neighboring DeKalb County
