= List of cities and towns along the Tennessee River =

This is an incomplete list of cities, towns, and communities along the Tennessee River and its branches in the United States. Currently only the more major cities and towns are mentioned.

== Alphabetically ==
- Bridgeport, Alabama
- Chattanooga, Tennessee
- Cherokee, Alabama
- Clifton, Tennessee
- Camden, Tennessee
- Crump, Tennessee
- Dayton, Tennessee
- Decatur, Alabama
- Florence, Alabama
- Gilbertsville, Kentucky
- Grand Rivers, Kentucky
- Guntersville, Alabama
- Harrison, Tennessee
- Huntsville, Alabama
- Killen, Alabama
- Kingston, Tennessee
- Knoxville, Tennessee
- Langston, Alabama
- Lenoir City, Tennessee
- Loudon, Tennessee
- Muscle Shoals, Alabama
- New Johnsonville, Tennessee
- Paducah, Kentucky
- Paris, Tennessee
- Parsons, Tennessee
- Savannah, Tennessee
- Scottsboro, Alabama
- Sheffield, Alabama
- Soddy-Daisy, Tennessee
- Signal Mountain, Tennessee
- South Pittsburg, Tennessee
- Triana, Alabama
- Waterloo, Alabama
