= Estillfork, Alabama =

Unincorporated community in Alabama, United States

- Unincorporated community
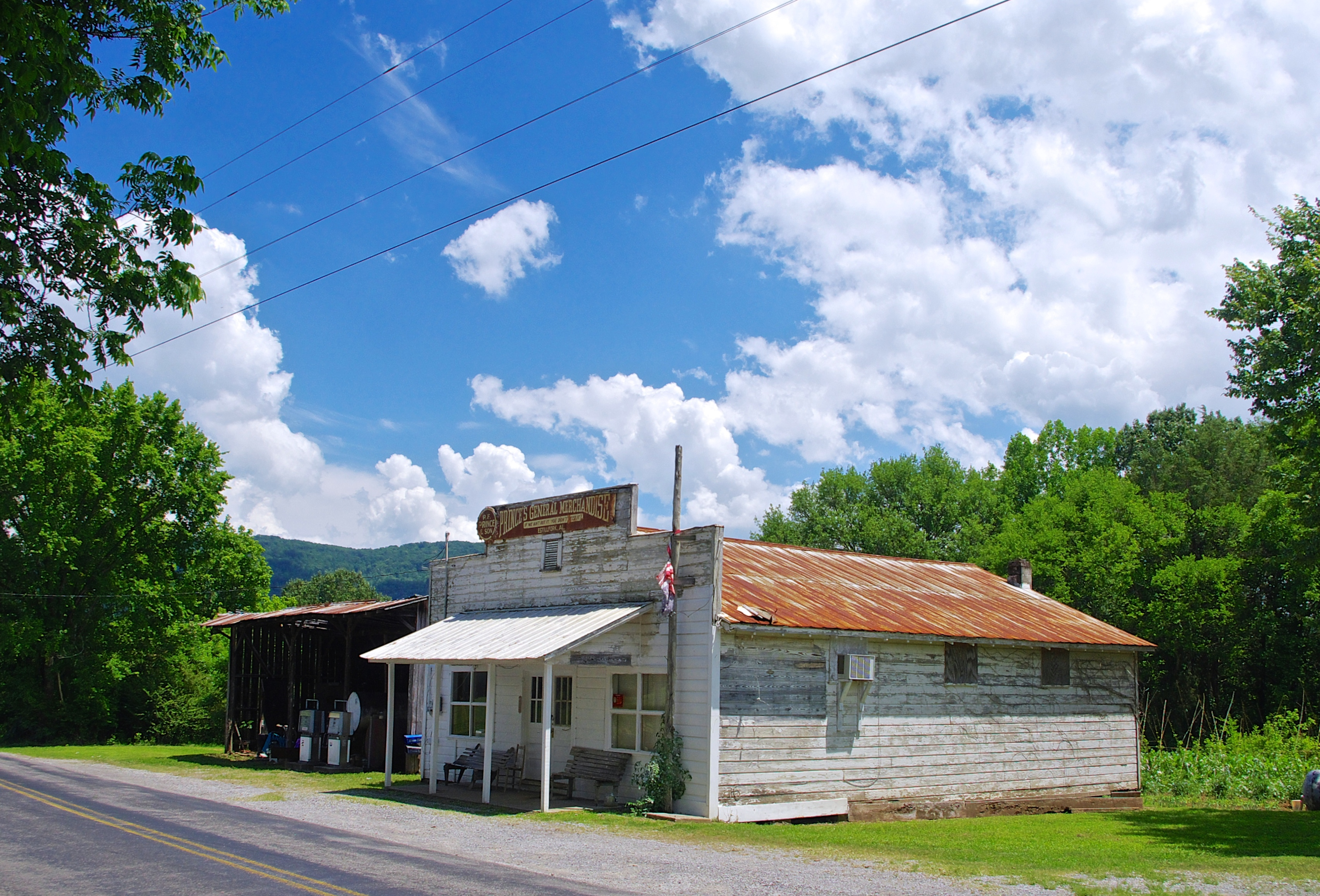
- Prince's General Merchandise in Estillfork

- Location within Alabama Location within the United States
- Coordinates: 34°54′36″N 86°10′14″W
- Country: United States
- State: Alabama
- County: Jackson
- Elevation: 705 ft (215 m)
- Time zone: UTC-6 (Central (CST))
  - Summer (DST): UTC-5 (CDT)
- ZIP code: 35745
- Area codes: 256 & 938
- GNIS feature ID: 156322

Estillfork is an unincorporated community in Jackson County, Alabama, United States. It is located in a rugged area at the head of the Paint Rock Valley in northern Jackson County. Just south of the community, the stream with which it shares its name, Estill Fork, joins Hurricane Creek to form the Paint Rock River. The Cumberland Plateau rises immediately to the east, and the Alabama-Tennessee state line passes a few miles to the north.

Estillfork has a post office with ZIP code 35745. The community and stream were named for early settlers in the area. Prince's General Merchandise, a general store which once served Estillfork, was established by Pete Prince in the early 1940s.
