= Woodville High School =

Woodville High School may refer to:

- Woodville High School (Alabama)
- Woodville High School (South Australia)
- Woodville High School (Texas)

== See also ==
- Baldwin-Woodville Area High School
- Woodsville High School
