= Swaim, Alabama =

Unincorporated community in Alabama, United States

- Unincorporated community
- Location within Alabama Location within the United States
- Coordinates: 34°52′10″N 86°11′54″W
- Country: United States
- State: Alabama
- County: Jackson
- Elevation: 666 ft (203 m)
- Time zone: UTC-6 (Central (CST))
  - Summer (DST): UTC-5 (CDT)
- Area code: 256
- GNIS feature ID: 157133

Swaim is an unincorporated community in northern Jackson County, Alabama, United States. It is located at the intersection of state routes 65 and 146, 5.7 miles (9.2 km) northwest of Skyline.

== History ==
The community was probably named after the family of Moses Swaim, who was an early settler of the area. A post office operated under the name Swaim from 1910 to 1955.
