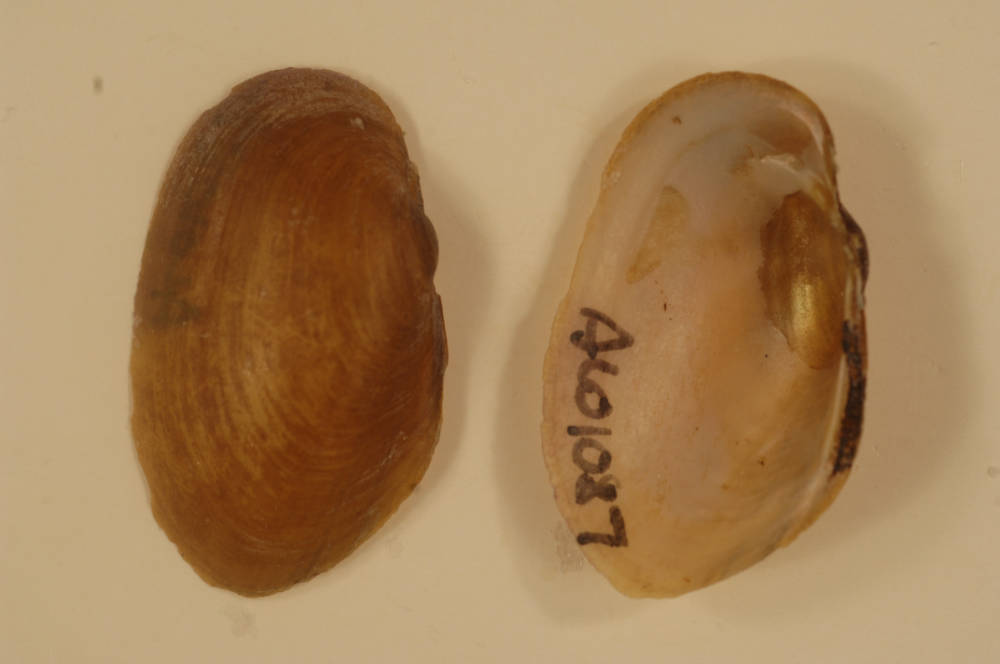

Conservation status
- Critically Endangered (IUCN 2.3)
- CITES Appendix I (CITES)

Scientific classification
- Kingdom: Animalia
- Phylum: Mollusca
- Class: Bivalvia
- Order: Unionida
- Family: Unionidae
- Genus: Lampsilis
- Species: L. virescens

Binomial name
- Lampsilis virescens (Lea, 1858)

= Lampsilis virescens =

Species of bivalve

Lampsilis virescens, the Alabama lamp naiad, Alabama lamp pearly mussel or Alabama lampmussel, is a species of freshwater mussel, an aquatic bivalve mollusk in the family Unionidae, the river mussels. It is an endangered species under the Endangered Species Act.

This species is endemic to the United States. This river mussel is currently limited to the Paint Rock River drainage in northeastern Alabama.

This mussel grows up to 6 centimeters long and is straw-colored or greenish and smooth and shiny.

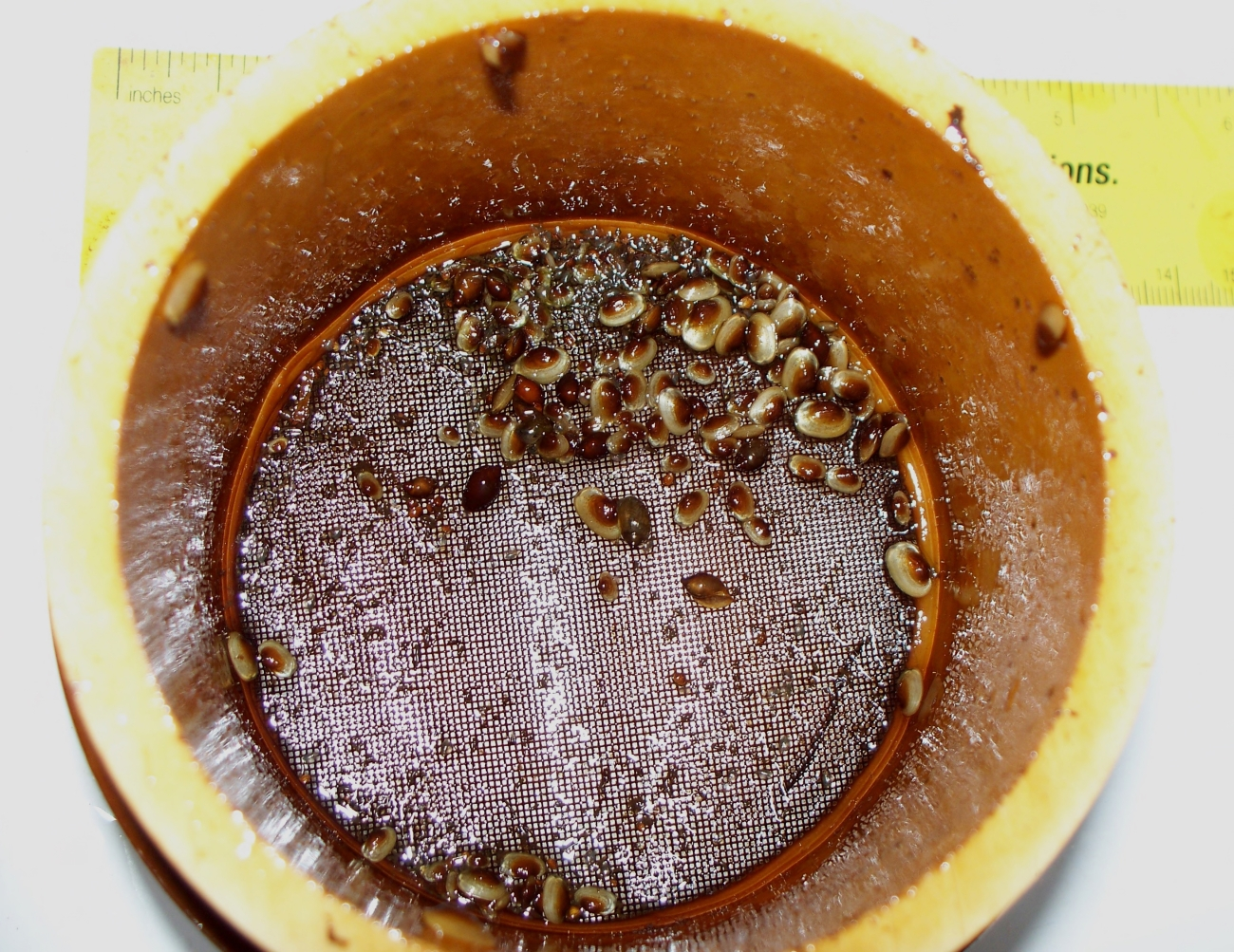
Juvenile Alabama lampmussel from a captive breeding program.
