= Card Switch, Alabama =

Unincorporated community in Alabama, United States

- Unincorporated community
- Location within Alabama Location within the United States
- Coordinates: 34°52′22″N 85°51′20″W
- Country: United States
- State: Alabama
- County: Jackson
- Elevation: 643 ft (196 m)
- Time zone: UTC-6 (Central (CST))
  - Summer (DST): UTC-5 (CDT)
- GNIS feature ID: 115611

Card Switch is an unincorporated community in Jackson County, Alabama, United States.

A CSX railway line runs through Card Switch.

The Burch Cemetery is located in Card Switch. Also located there is the Morning Star Missionary Baptist Church. Elias Camp Morris, who went on to become president of the National Baptist Convention in 1895, joined the church in 1874 and was licensed to preach the following year.
