= Paint Rock River National Wildlife Refuge =

National Wildlife Refuge in Tennessee

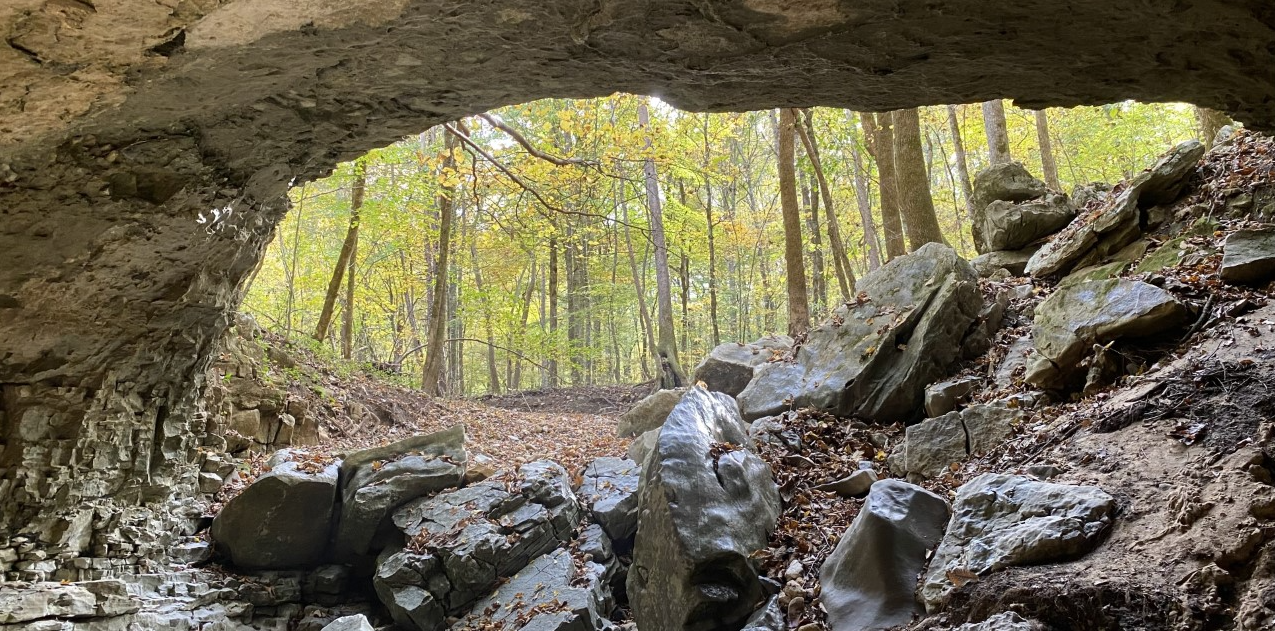
- A cave and forest in the karst topography of the Paint Rock River National Wildlife Refuge.

- Location within Tennessee Location within the United States
- Location: Franklin County, Tennessee, United States
- Nearest city: Hixson, Tennessee
- Coordinates: 35.05°N 86.11°W
- Area: 87.37 acres (35.36 ha)
- Established: September 2023
- Governing body: United States Fish and Wildlife Service
- Website: Paint Rock River National Wildlife Refuge

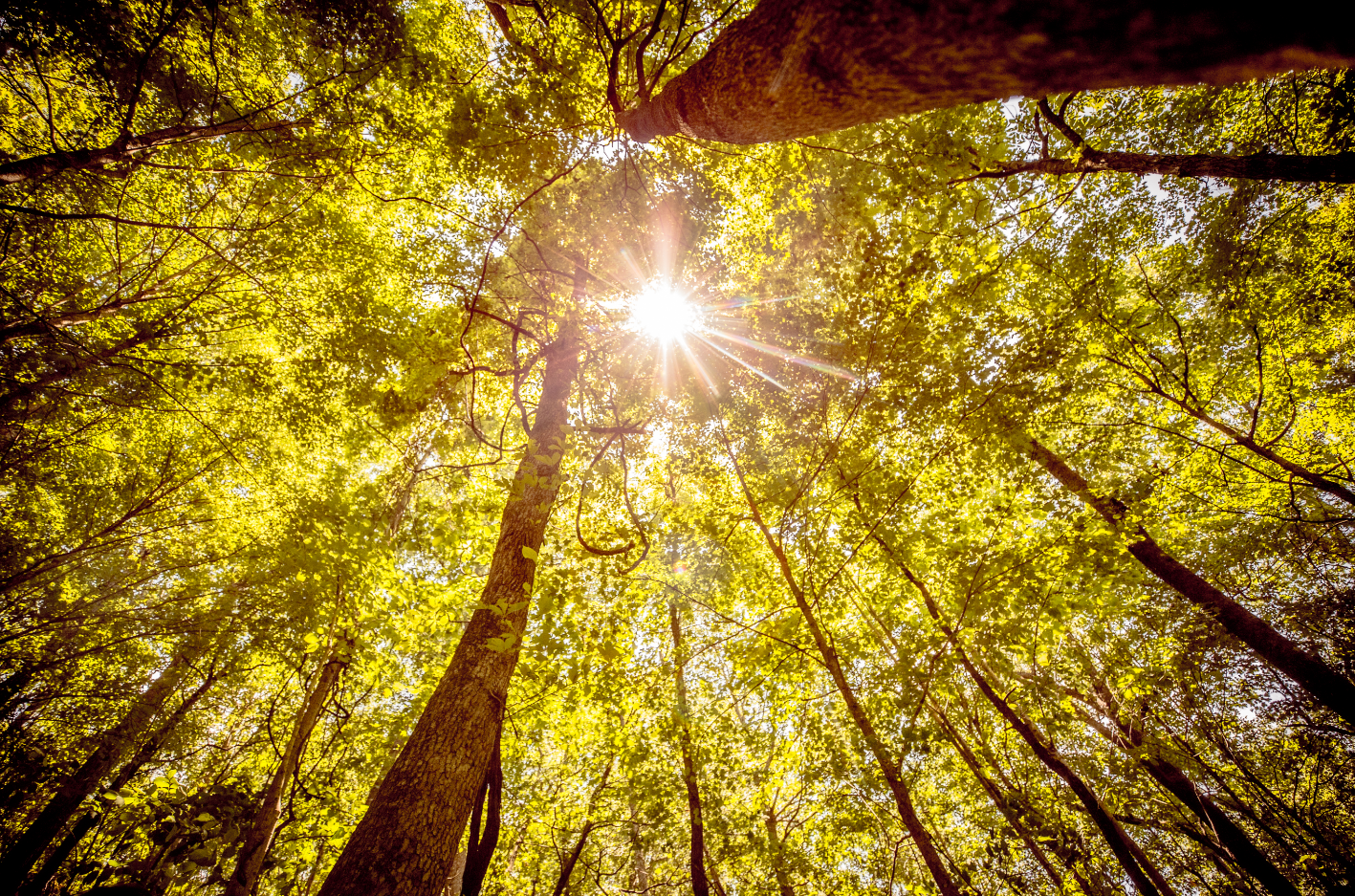
The canopy in a forest in the refuge on September 13, 2023.

The Paint Rock River National Wildlife Refuge is a National Wildlife Refuge of the United States in Franklin County, Tennessee.

== Geography ==
The Paint Rock River National Wildlife Refuge is located in Franklin County in south-central Tennessee near the border with Alabama. It lies in Middle Tennessee on the Cumberland Plateau in the watershed of the Paint Rock River, a tributary of the Tennessee River. It covers an area of 87.37 acres (35.36 hectares) and includes upland forest, streams, caves, and karst topography. It lies amid 40,000 acres (16,187 ha) of protected land and links conservation lands in both Tennessee and Alabama administered by the governments of those states or by conservation organizations.

== Flora and fauna ==
The Paint Rock River National Wildlife Refuge is part of one of the last remaining large tracts of deciduous hardwood forest in eastern North America. Its forests, streams, and cave and karst systems provide a diversity of aquatic, terrestrial, and karst habitats that support a variety of fish and wildlife, including at least 15 species the United States Government lists as threatened or endangered, three species considered candidates for such listing, and 40 species listed as threatened or endangered by the Government of Tennessee. Threatened or endangered species found in the refuge include the gray bat (Myotis grisescens), the Indiana bat (Myotis sodalis), the Tennessee cave salamander (Gyrinophilus palleucus), the Alabama cave shrimp (Palaemonias alabamae), and freshwater mussels (order Bivalvia). Over 100 species of fish and 50 species of mussel live in the refuge's waters, some of them found nowhere else; according to one estimate, more species of fish live in any single half-mile (0.8 km) stretch of the Paint Rock River than are found in all of California. The refuge's habitats also support migratory birds passing through the area, including neotropical migratory birds and other species of conservation concern.

== History ==
The 460-square-mile (1,191 km^{2}) Paint Rock River watershed lies in an historically rural area and has long been the scene of agricultural, forestry, hunting, and fishing activities. Since at least the mid-1960s, conservationists began to call for its protection before development could encroach on the area, and the Open Space Institute had joined the effort by 2013. In 2016 the United States Government authorized the establishment of a National Wildlife Refuge in the Paint Rock River's upper watershed in Franklin County, Tennessee, permitting the United States Fish and Wildlife Service (USFWS) to acquire up to 25,120 acres (10,166 hectares) of land for it through fee title acquisitions or conservation easements. Via a public process, the USFWS delineated a "Conservation Partnership Area" in the watershed within which it worked with private landowners and conservation agencies and organizations to develop a land protection plan for the common purpose of protecting the upper watershed. Changes in USFWS priorities and stalled efforts in acquiring land delayed the establishment of a refuge, leaving the Paint Rock River and its gorges and caves largely unprotected.

The effort to establish the refuge became active again in the summer of 2023 when the Niedergeses family, which owned land in the upper watershed that it wanted protected, sold its land to The Nature Conservancy at a discounted price of US$375,000, three-quarters of which the Open Space Institute paid, with the rest coming from The Tucker Foundation and others. After The Nature Conservancy and the Open Space Institute donated the 87.37-acre (35.36-hectare) parcel of land for the establishment of a refuge adjacent to the Tennessee Wildlife Resources Agency's Bear Hollow Mountain Wildlife Management Area, the USFWS dedicated the Paint Rock River National Wildlife Refuge on the property in September 2023. The United States Department of the Interior publicly announced its creation on October 10, 2023, as the 570th unit of the National Wildlife Refuge System.

== Management ==
The USFWS administers the Paint Rock River National Wildlife Refuge. It works with agencies of the Government of Tennessee and the Government of Alabama and with private conservation groups that also manage protected lands in the Paint Rock River watershed and the hardwood forest tract to coordinate conservation efforts throughout the watershed and the forest.

== Activities ==
The USFWS protects the wildlife and habitats of the Paint Rock River watershed that lie within the Paint Rock River National Wildlife Refuge, part of an Appalachian ecosystem important for the maintenance of biodiversity and for natural adaptation to and resilience in the face of climate change. Its activities include the protection and improvement of the water quality and quantity and the hydrology of the Paint Rock River, taking into account both the health of the natural environment and the provision of recreational opportunities to meet the economic and recreational needs of local human communities that use the area's water resources. It also provides environmental education and interpretation opportunities for visitors.

== Recreation ==
As of July 2025, the USFWS had not yet published information on recreational opportunities in the Paint Rock River National Wildlife Refuge. It anticipated permitting hunting, fishing, hiking, wildlife observation, wildlife photography, and environmental educational and interpretation activities in the refuge once it completed a plan for recreational use of the refuge compatible with its conservation goals, support for the local economy, and the expansion of recreational opportunities that preserve the way of life in the area.
