= Hytop, Alabama =

- Town
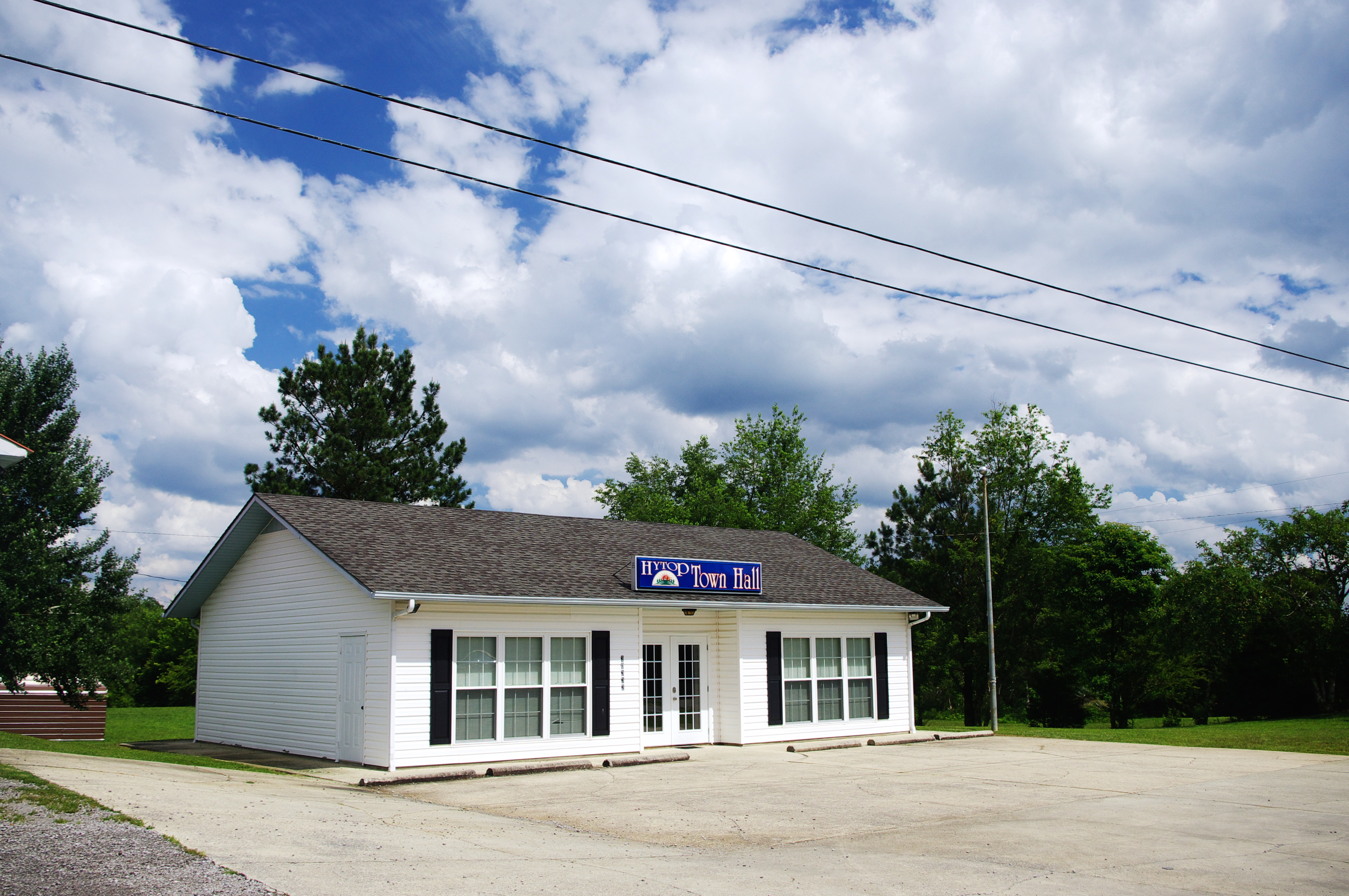
- Hytop Town Hall

- Location of Hytop in Jackson County, Alabama.
- Coordinates: 34°54′17″N 86°5′12″W
- Country: United States
- State: Alabama
- County: Jackson

Government

Area
  - Total: 3.46 sq mi (8.97 km^{2})
  - Land: 3.46 sq mi (8.96 km^{2})
  - Water: 0.0039 sq mi (0.01 km^{2})
- Elevation: 1,709 ft (521 m)

Population (2020)
  - Total: 441
  - Density: 127.5/sq mi (49.21/km^{2})
- Time zone: UTC-6 (Central (CST))
  - Summer (DST): UTC-5 (CDT)
- ZIP code: 35768
- Area code: 256
- FIPS code: 01-37264
- GNIS feature ID: 0156510
- Website: https://townofhytop.com/

Hytop is a town in Jackson County, Alabama, United States. It incorporated on May 17, 1991. As of the 2020 census, Hytop had a population of 441. The Walls of Jericho, a popular hiking area, is located just north of Hytop.

== Geography ==
Hytop is located at 34°54′17″N 86°5′12″W (34.904816, -86.086634). The town is situated atop the Cumberland Plateau just south of the Alabama-Tennessee state line. State Route 79 traverses Hytop, connecting the town with Skyline to the south, and Tennessee to the north. The highway becomes Tennessee State Route 16 at the border, and continues northward to Winchester, Tennessee. A narrow valley carved by Hurricane Creek (a tributary of the Paint Rock River) is located just west of Hytop, and The Walls of Jericho lie near the head of this valley at the state line.

According to the U.S. Census Bureau, the town has a total area of 2.3 square miles (6.0 km^{2}), all land.

== Demographics ==
Historical population
Census	Pop.	Note	%±
2000	315		—
2010	354		12.4%
2020	441		24.6%
U.S. Decennial Census; 2013 Estimate

As of the census of 2000, there were 315 people, 124 households, and 108 families residing in the town. The population density was 139.5 inhabitants per square mile (53.9/km^{2}). There were 139 housing units at an average density of 61.5 per square mile (23.7/km^{2}). The racial makeup of the town was 96.19% White, 1.27% Native American, and 2.54% from two or more races. 0.32% of the population were Hispanic or Latino of any race.

There were 124 households, out of which 37.9% had children under the age of 18 living with them, 76.6% were married couples living together, 7.3% had a female householder with no husband present, and 12.1% were non-families. 10.5% of all households were made up of individuals, and 4.8% had someone living alone who was 65 years of age or older. The average household size was 2.54 and the average family size was 2.72.

In the town, the population was spread out, with 23.8% under the age of 18, 9.2% from 18 to 24, 34.9% from 25 to 44, 24.4% from 45 to 64, and 7.6% who were 65 years of age or older. The median age was 35 years. For every 100 females, there were 99.4 males. For every 100 females age 18 and over, there were 90.5 males.

The median income for a household in the town was $34,306, and the median income for a family was $34,821. Males had a median income of $29,107 versus $19,286 for females. The per capita income for the town was $15,093. None of the families and none of the population were living below the poverty line.

== Radar site ==
The National Weather Service has a radar site in Hytop. It was damaged during the 2011 Super Outbreak, but later replaced.
