= Baileytown, Alabama =

Unincorporated community in Alabama, United States

- Unincorporated community
- Location within Alabama Location within the United States
- Coordinates: 34°51′32″N 86°10′10″W
- Country: United States
- State: Alabama
- County: Jackson
- Elevation: 1,706 ft (520 m)
- Time zone: UTC-6 (Central (CST))
  - Summer (DST): UTC-5 (CDT)
- Area code: 256
- GNIS feature ID: 156015

Baileytown is an unincorporated community in northern Jackson County, Alabama, United States, located approximately three miles northwest of Skyline.
