= Rash, Alabama =

Unincorporated community in Alabama, United States

- Unincorporated community
- Location within Alabama Location within the United States
- Coordinates: 34°52′26″N 85°53′42″W
- Country: United States
- State: Alabama
- County: Jackson
- Elevation: 643 ft (196 m)
- Time zone: UTC-6 (Central (CST))
  - Summer (DST): UTC-5 (CDT)
- Area code: 256

Rash, also known as Coffeys Store, is an unincorporated community in Jackson County, Alabama, United States.

== History ==
A post office called Rash was established in 1901, and remained in operation until it was discontinued in 1956. The community was named for a local resident, William Rash, and was also home to a local business, Coffey's Store. Rash has been noted for its unusual place name.
