= Woodville High School (Alabama) =

Public school in Woodville, Alabama, United States

Woodville High School School

Location
- 290 County Road 63D; Woodville, Alabama 35776; United States; 34.6228°N 86.27177°W

Information
- School type: Public K-12
- Motto: Learn Today, Lead Tomorrow
- School district: Jackson County School District
- Principal: Daniel Evans
- Grades: K–12
- Student to teacher ratio: 25.50 (FTE)
- Colors: Black and Gold
- Website: woodville.jacksonk12.org

Woodville High School (WHS) is a public elementary middle, and high school serving students grades PK-12 located in Woodville, Jackson County, Alabama, United States. It serves as one of the schools within the Jackson County School District. It is one of 18 public schools and six K-12 schools in the district. In 2024, it received an accountability score of 86 from the Alabama Department of Education.

== Athletics ==
Woodville High School students participate in the following sports:

- Baseball
- Basketball
- Cross country
- Football
- Hoops Squad
- Golf
- Softball
- Track and field
- Volleyball

== Notable alumni ==
- Harlon Hill
