= Bolivar, Alabama =

Unincorporated community in Alabama, United States

- Unincorporated community
- Location within Alabama Location within the United States
- Coordinates: 34°54′48″N 85°46′30″W
- Country: United States
- State: Alabama
- County: Jackson
- Elevation: 623 ft (190 m)
- Time zone: UTC-6 (Central (CST))
  - Summer (DST): UTC-5 (CDT)
- Area code: 256
- GNIS feature ID: 163926

Bolivar, also known as Widows, is an unincorporated community in northern Jackson County, Alabama, United States. It is located on Alabama State Route 277, halfway between Bridgeport and Stevenson. It was originally called New Bolivar after many of the citizens of the old community of Bolivar, which was located near the current community of Edgefield near Stevenson, relocated to the railroad well after it was completed through the area in 1854. The old community faded away and New Bolivar never really grew. On original maps from the 1880s, New Bolivar was located where the former North Jackson Hospital stands on Alabama Highway 277.

== History ==
The community was named in honor of Simón Bolívar. A post office operated under the name Bolivar from 1835 to 1904.
