= Larkin, Alabama =

Unincorporated community in Alabama, United States

- Unincorporated community
- Location within Alabama Location within the United States
- Coordinates: 34°54′34″N 86°12′55″W
- Country: United States
- State: Alabama
- County: Jackson
- Elevation: 669 ft (204 m)
- Time zone: UTC-6 (Central (CST))
  - Summer (DST): UTC-5 (CDT)
- Area code: 256
- GNIS feature ID: 156582

Larkin is an unincorporated community in northern Jackson County, Alabama, United States. It is located on Alabama State Route 65, 12.4 miles (20.0 km) northwest of Skyline.

== History ==
A post office operated under the name Larkin from 1894 to 1914.
