= Little Nashville, Alabama =

- Ghost town
- Location within Alabama Location within the United States
- Coordinates: 34°45′10″N 86°13′52″W
- Country: United States
- State: Alabama
- County: Jackson
- Elevation: 630 ft (190 m)
- Time zone: UTC-6 (Central (CST))
  - Summer (DST): UTC-5 (CDT)
- GNIS feature ID: 156615

Little Nashville is a ghost town in Jackson County, Alabama, United States.

The settlement was located along the Paint Rock River. Northeast of the settlement is a hilly projection of land called "Little Nashville Point".

== History ==
The settlement was named "Little Nashville" because a steel bridge fabricated in Nashville, Tennessee crossed the Paint Rock River at that location. Little Nashville was once "a thriving village".

A former home in Little Nashville was described as the Paint Rock River valley's best example of Queen Anne style architecture, while The Browning House (c. 1850) west of Little Nashville served as a Union Army hospital during the Civil War.

Little Nashville Farm, a 972 acres (393 ha) property identified as an "Alabama Treasure Forest", is located at the former settlement.
