= Scottsboro City Schools =

Public school district in Scottsboro, Alabama

Coordinates: 34.6707°N 86.0313°W

Location
- Scottsboro, Alabama United States

District information
- Type: Public
- Grades: K–12
- Superintendent: Amy Childress
- Schools: 6

Students and staff
- Students: 2,442 (2020–2021)
- Teachers: 147 (on FTE basis)
- Student–teacher ratio: 16.7:1
- District mascot: Wildcat

Other information
- Website: www.scottsboroschools.net

Scottsboro City Schools is a public school district headquartered in Scottsboro, Alabama. The district's boundaries parallel those of the city limits.

In the Scottsboro City School system, there are about 2,450 students, divided among five different schools, as well as an alternative school. Each school has its own mascot, such as the Brownwood Beaver. However, the Scottsboro Wildcat is the one mascot the whole city shares.

== Schools ==
- Nelson Elementary (Pre-K and K)
- Caldwell Elementary (1st–3rd)
- Collins Intermediate (4th–6th)
- Scottsboro Junior High School (7th–8th)
- Scottsboro High School (9th–12th)

The district was scheduled to begin an alternative education program for students with disciplinary issues beginning in fall 1988.

=== Former schools ===
- Brownwood Elementary – Closed May 2018
  - It began operations in 1961. Declining enrollment figures lead to the dissolution of the school. The district planned to divide the students across remaining elementary campuses.

== See also ==
- Jackson County School District
