= Mount Carmel, Alabama =

- Unincorporated community
- Location within Alabama Location within the United States
- Coordinates: 32.063412°N 86.375076°W
- Country: United States
- State: Alabama
- County: Montgomery
- Elevation: 259 ft (79 m)
- Time zone: UTC-6 (Central (CST))
  - Summer (DST): UTC-5 (CDT)
- Area code: 334

Mount Carmel is an unincorporated community in Montgomery County, Alabama, United States, located 24 miles (39 km) south of Montgomery and 10 miles (16 km) from Letohatchee.

According to the Montgomery City Directory of 1880, it had a three churches (M. E. South, Methodist, and Baptist). There were two schools, Mount Carmel Academy and Bethlehem Academy. Mail was delivered privately twice a week. There were, among others, a blacksmith and two doctors, and a grist mills and cotton gins.
