= Long Island, Alabama =

Unincorporated community in Alabama, United States

- Unincorporated community
- Location within Alabama Location within the United States
- Coordinates: 34°46′11″N 85°41′40″W
- Country: United States
- State: Alabama
- County: Jackson
- Elevation: 646 ft (197 m)
- Time zone: UTC-6 (Central (CST))
  - Summer (DST): UTC-5 (CDT)
- Area code: 256
- GNIS feature ID: 154472

Long Island (also called Carpenter, Carpenter Station, and Carpenters Station) is an unincorporated community in the northeastern corner of Jackson County, Alabama, United States. Long Island appears on the Bridgeport U.S. Geological Survey Map. It was reportedly named Carpenter for a family that lived there prior to 1852, when it was given the English form of the original Cherokee name of the village on the long island in the Tennessee River dating from 1783.
