= Lim Rock, Alabama =

Unincorporated community in Alabama, United States

- Unincorporated community
- Location within Alabama Location within the United States
- Coordinates: 34°40′20″N 86°11′18″W
- Country: United States
- State: Alabama
- County: Jackson
- Elevation: 620 ft (190 m)
- Time zone: UTC-6 (Central (CST))
  - Summer (DST): UTC-5 (CDT)
- Area code: 256
- GNIS feature ID: 154471

Lim Rock, also known as Limrock, Lime Rock, Boyds Switch, or Boyd Switch, is an unincorporated community in southern Jackson County, Alabama, United States. It is located on Alabama State Route 35 halfway between Scottsboro and Woodville.

== History ==
The community was originally named Boyd Switch in honor of local merchant John Boyd and was a stop on the Southern Railway. The name was then changed to Lim Rock after a local citizen made a contribution to the Methodist church with the stipulation that the community name be changed. A post office operated under the name Boyd Switch from 1870 to 1882 and under the name Lim Rock from 1882 to 1956.
