= Liberty Hill, Jackson County, Alabama =

Unincorporated community in Alabama, United States

- Unincorporated community
- Location within Alabama Location within the United States
- Coordinates: 34°49′40″N 85°42′52″W
- Country: United States
- State: Alabama
- County: Jackson
- Elevation: 1,519 ft (463 m)
- Time zone: UTC-6 (Central (CST))
  - Summer (DST): UTC-5 (CDT)
- Area codes: 256 & 938
- GNIS feature ID: 156607

Liberty Hill is an unincorporated community in Jackson County, Alabama, United States. Liberty Hill is located on County Route 14, 7.6 miles (12.2 km) east-southeast of Stevenson.
