= Pikeville, Jackson County, Alabama =

Unincorporated community in Alabama, United States

- Unincorporated community
- Location within Alabama Location within the United States
- Coordinates: 34°44′37″N 86°02′19″W
- Country: United States
- State: Alabama
- County: Jackson
- Elevation: 630 ft (190 m)

Population (1985)
  - Total: 121
- Time zone: UTC-6 (Central (CST))
  - Summer (DST): UTC-5 (CDT)
- Area code: 256
- GNIS feature ID: 156886

Pikeville is an unincorporated community in northern Jackson County, Alabama, United States. Pikeville is named for the fact that the community was located at the head of a turnpike.

== Local features ==
This unincorporated community is home to the Pikeville Store N Deli.

The Pikeville Store-N-Deli has been described by regional media as a longstanding local institution in Jackson County.
