= Bellefonte, Alabama =

- Ghost town
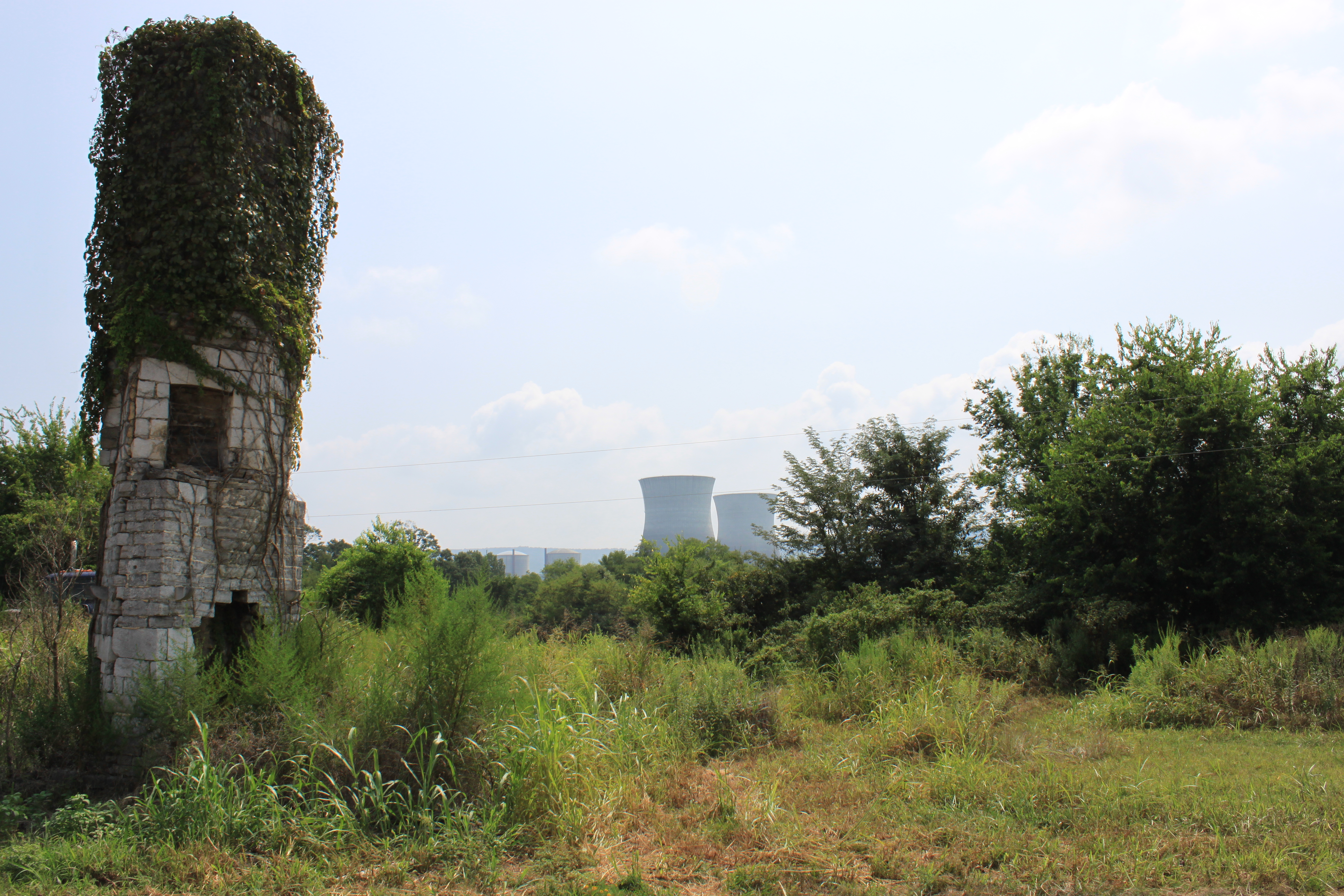
- The chimney of the local inn in foreground, with Bellefonte Nuclear Generating Station in the background

- Location within Alabama Location within the United States
- Coordinates: 34°42′40″N 85°56′43″W
- Country: United States
- State: Alabama
- County: Jackson
- Elevation: 745 ft (227 m)
- Time zone: UTC-6 (Central (CST))
  - Summer (DST): UTC-5 (CDT)
- ZIP code: 35752
- Area code: 256
- GNIS feature ID: 0113878

Bellefonte is a ghost town in Jackson County, Alabama, United States, near the site of the Bellefonte Nuclear Generating Station. It is located roughly two miles southeast of Hollywood, Alabama.

== History ==
Bellefonte was settled in the early 19th century and incorporated on December 15, 1821, when it had nearly 200 residents. Its name was a subjective description consisting of the French words "belle", meaning "beautiful," and "fonte", meaning "fount." It was the Jackson County seat from 1821 to 1868, when it was relocated to Scottsboro.

During the 1820s, a courthouse and church were constructed. A post office was established in 1830. By 1844, the population had grown to 400. The town suffered severe damage during the Civil War. The post office was closed in 1859.

Bellefonte was used as a supply depot and mustering site during the Cherokee removal.

The relocation of the county seat in 1868 drew off business and people from town. This town rapidly lost population, dropping off the census rolls by 1880. The town was abandoned by the 1920s. All that remains of Bellefonte today are the cemetery, the chimney of the local inn, and piles of scattered bricks.

== Demographics ==
Historical population
Census	Pop.	Note	%±
1860	181		—
1870	72		−60.2%
U.S. Decennial Census

Bellefonte was listed on the 1860 and 1870 U.S. Census rolls. In 1860, it was the most populous (and only) incorporated community in Jackson County with 181 persons (of whom 173 were White, and 8 were "Free Colored"; no slaves were recorded.)
