= Larkinsville, Alabama =

- Unincorporated community
- Location within Alabama Location within the United States
- Coordinates: 34°41′23″N 86°7′36″W
- Country: United States
- State: Alabama
- County: Jackson
- Time zone: UTC-6 (Central (CST))
  - Summer (DST): UTC-5 (CDT)
- ZIP code: 35766
- Area codes: 256 & 938
- GNIS feature ID: 121399

Larkinsville is a historic village and populated place in Jackson County, Alabama, United States. Founded in 1828 by David Larkin, it was incorporated into the nearby City of Scottsboro in the late 1960s. In 1895, Larkinsville had a population of 216. As late as 1940, the population was 320 according to the U.S. Census. The historic Blue Spring Cemetery is located one mile southwest of the old village center.

== History ==
David Larkin, third son born to a family of pioneers in Tennessee, established a trading post at Larkin's Landing on the Tennessee River near Goosepond Island shortly after Alabama gained statehood in 1819. In the 1820s, he established a plantation of 32,000 acres two miles west of present-day Scottsboro, and the village of Larkinsville developed around it. A post office was established in 1830, with David Larkin as postmaster, and Larkinsville became the most populous town in Jackson County up until the Civil War. The first overland route through Larkinsville, now known as the Old Stage Road or County Road 30 ran from Huntland, Tennessee, across Cumberland Mountain and ended at Larkin's Landing. In 1850 the Memphis and Charleston railroad extended its line through Jackson County; David Larkin, as a railroad commissioner, established a station at Larkinsville.

In the Civil War, Company K, the Larkinsville Guards, was organized in Larkinsville and served with the 4th Alabama Regiment under Captain A.C. Murray. The war devastated Larkinsville, as it did most of North Alabama. On June 30, 1862, shortly after the fall of Huntsville, the Tenth Wisconsin regiment occupied Larkinsville. As a stop along the strategically important railroad, Larkinsville would be occupied by Union forces for the remainder of the war, including the 13th Wisconsin, the 10th Iowa, the 116th Illinois, and the 101st U.S. Colored Regiment.

The postwar establishment of the county seat at Scottsboro began a gradual movement of people and business away from Larkinsville. The railroad kept the village alive into the 1930s, but Alabama State Road 35 and U.S. 72, the main east-west highways in Jackson county, bypassed Larkinsville entirely. Today the formerly thriving village remains a tiny rural community.
