= Langston, Alabama =

- Town
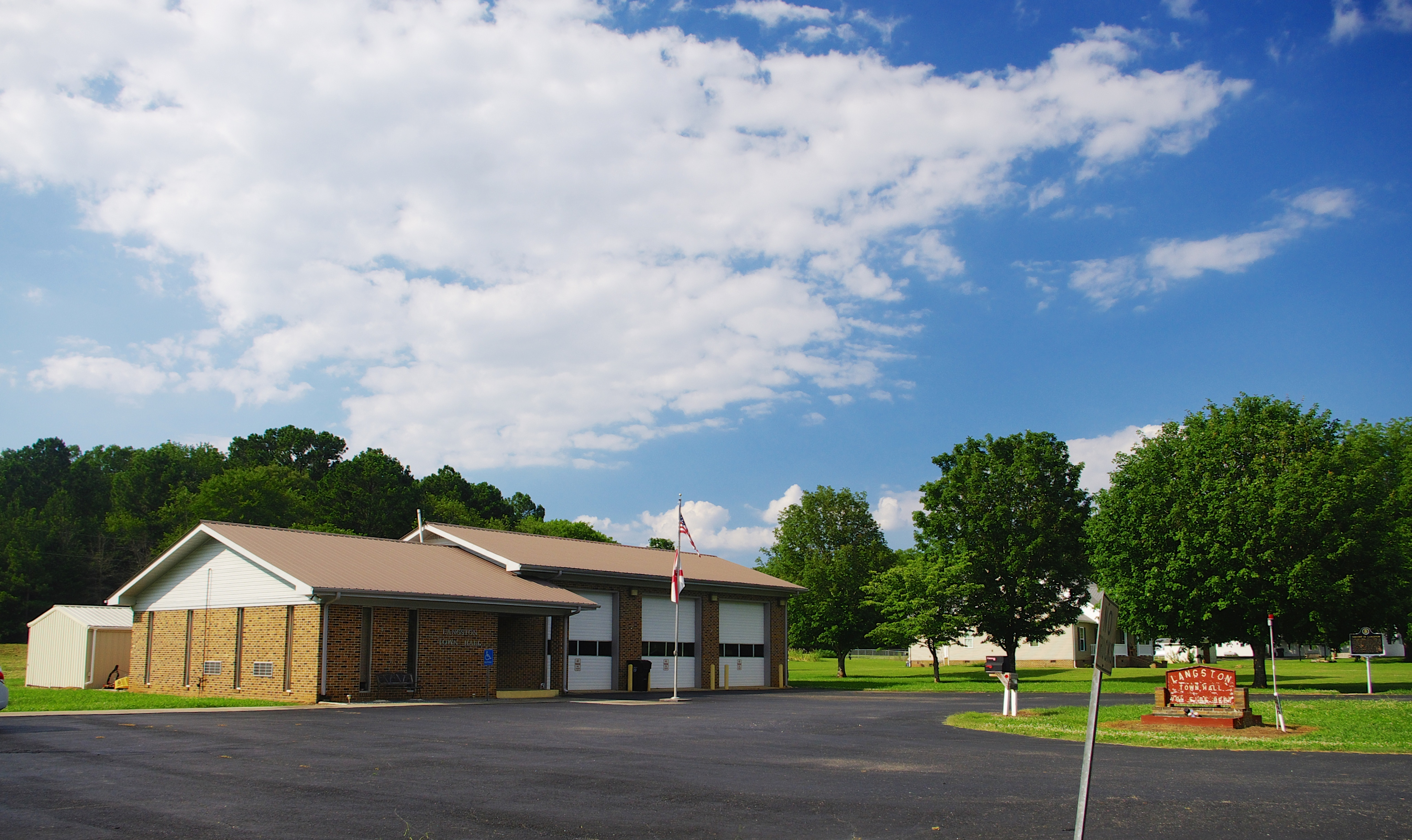
- Langston Town Hall

- Location of Langston in Jackson County, Alabama
- Coordinates: 34°32′5″N 86°4′56″W
- Country: United States
- State: Alabama
- County: Jackson

Area
  - Total: 8.24 sq mi (21.35 km^{2})
  - Land: 4.93 sq mi (12.76 km^{2})
  - Water: 3.32 sq mi (8.60 km^{2})
- Elevation: 630 ft (192 m)

Population (2020)
  - Total: 265
  - Density: 53.8/sq mi (20.77/km^{2})
- Time zone: UTC-6 (Central (CST))
  - Summer (DST): UTC-5 (CDT)
- ZIP code: 35755
- Area code: 256
- FIPS code: 01-41368
- GNIS feature ID: 0151989

Langston is a town in Jackson County, Alabama, United States, and is included in the Chattanooga-Cleveland-Dalton, TN-GA-AL Combined Statistical Area. As of the 2020 census, Langston had a population of 265. It initially incorporated in 1899. At some point after 1920 it disincorporated, then reincorporated in 1980 (after the census was taken that year, since it was not counted). Its peak population was 500, in 1920.

== History ==
Langston was settled in the 1810s, and was initially known as "Coffeetown" after the Coffee brothers, who were among the early settlers. A post office was established in 1845 with Langston Coffee as the first postmaster. In 1869, most of Coffeetown's residents moved to Texas, and the following year, James Morgan sold lots for the creation of a new town. The new town was named "Langston" after Langston Coffee.

Langston initially thrived as a river port along the Tennessee River, eventually growing to include nine stores and a blacksmith. With the rise of railroad traffic in the late 19th century and automobile traffic in the early 20th, it began to decline. The construction of Guntersville Dam by the Tennessee Valley Authority in the late 1930s flooded a significant portion, further reducing its population.

== Geography ==
Langston is located at 34°32′05″N 86°04′56″W. The town is situated on the eastern shore of the Tennessee River, at river mile 377. This section of the river is part of Guntersville Lake, which is formed by Guntersville Dam nearly 30 miles (48 km) downstream. Sand Mountain rises immediately to the east of Langston. Scottsboro lies across the river to the north, and Section lies atop Sand Mountain to the northeast. County Road 67 connects Langston with State Route 35 to the northeast.

According to the U.S. Census Bureau, the town has a total area of 8.3 square miles (21 km^{2}), of which 5.0 square miles (13 km^{2}) is land and 3.2 square miles (8.3 km^{2}) (39.06%) is water.

== Demographics ==
Historical population
Census	Pop.	Note	%±
1900	270		—
1910	314		16.3%
1920	500		59.2%
1990	207		—
2000	254		22.7%
2010	270		6.3%
2020	265		−1.9%
U.S. Decennial Census; 2013 Estimate

As of the census of 2000, there were 254 people, 109 households, and 80 families residing in the town. The population density was 50.4 inhabitants per square mile (19.5/km^{2}). There were 193 housing units at an average density of 38.3 per square mile (14.8/km^{2}). The racial makeup of the town was 94.09% White, 3.15% Black or African American and 2.76% Native American.

There were 109 households, out of which 21.1% had children under the age of 18 living with them, 61.5% were married couples living together, 9.2% had a female householder with no husband present, and 25.7% were non-families. 25.7% of all households were made up of individuals, and 12.8% had someone living alone who was 65 years of age or older. The average household size was 2.33 and the average family size was 2.74.

In the town, the population was spread out, with 19.3% under the age of 18, 6.3% from 18 to 24, 22.4% from 25 to 44, 35.0% from 45 to 64, and 16.9% who were 65 years of age or older. The median age was 46 years. For every 100 females, there were 91.0 males. For every 100 females age 18 and over, there were 89.8 males.

The median income for a household in the town was $33,333, and the median income for a family was $42,344. Males had a median income of $26,750 versus $29,375 for females. The per capita income for the town was $16,266. About 2.7% of families and 6.7% of the population were below the poverty line, including none of those under the age of eighteen and 13.9% of those 65 or over.
