= Jackson County, Alabama =

County in Alabama, United States

- County
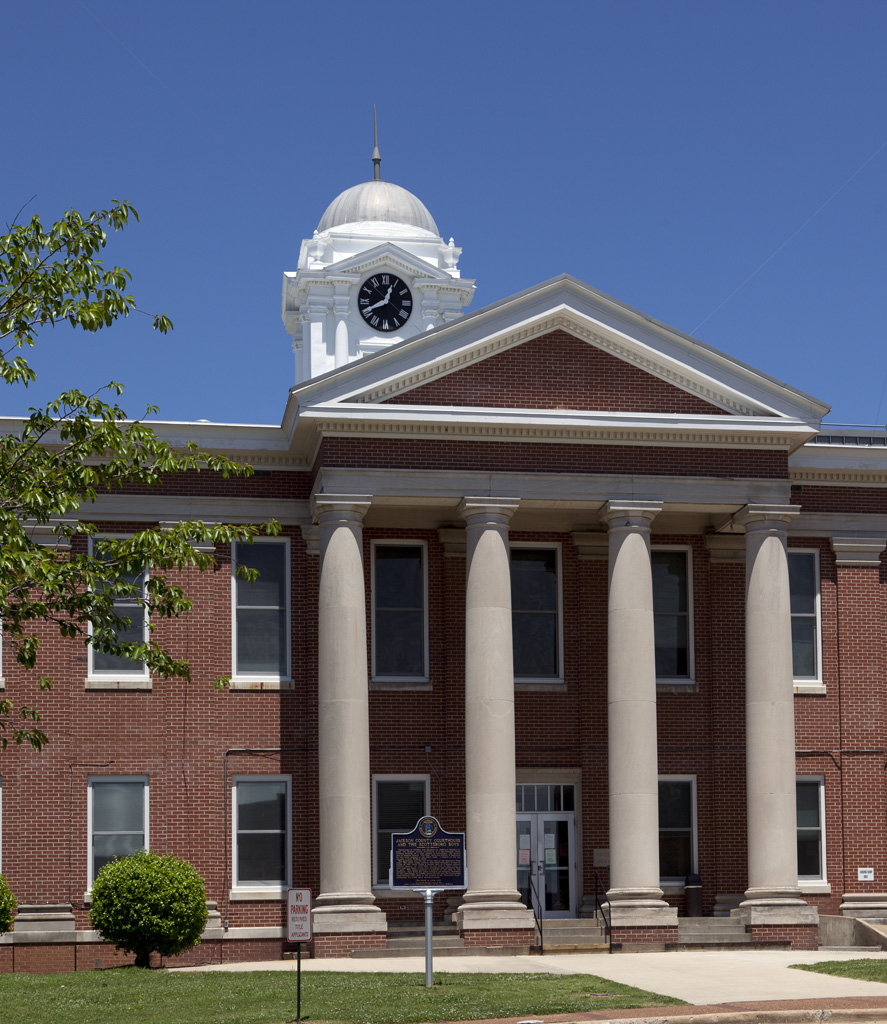
- Jackson County Courthouse in Scottsboro

- Seal Logo

- Location within the U.S. state of Alabama
- Coordinates: 34°47′00″N 86°00′00″W
- Country: United States
- State: Alabama
- Founded: December 13, 1819
- Named for: Andrew Jackson
- Seat: Scottsboro
- Largest city: Scottsboro

Area
  - Total: 1,127 sq mi (2,920 km^{2})
  - Land: 1,078 sq mi (2,790 km^{2})
  - Water: 49 sq mi (130 km^{2}) 4.3%

Population (2020)
  - Total: 52,579
  - Estimate (2025): 54,281 ▲
  - Density: 48.77/sq mi (18.83/km^{2})
- Time zone: UTC−6 (Central)
  - Summer (DST): UTC−5 (CDT)
- Congressional district: 5th
- Website: www.jacksoncountyal.gov
- County Number 39 on Alabama License Plates

Jackson County is the northeasternmost county in the U.S. state of Alabama. As of the 2020 census, the population was 52,579. The county seat is Scottsboro. The county was named for Andrew Jackson, general in the United States Army and afterward President of the United States of America. Jackson County is a prohibition or dry county, but three cities within the county (Bridgeport, Scottsboro, and Stevenson) are "wet", allowing alcohol sales. Jackson County comprises the Scottsboro, Alabama Micropolitan Statistical Area, and Jackson county is included in the Chattanooga–Cleveland–Dalton combined statistical area. It is the site of Russell Cave National Monument, an archeological site with evidence of 8,000 years of human occupation in the Southeast.

== History ==
Jackson County was established on December 13, 1819, after the federal government arranged a treaty to remove the Cherokee from the area and extinguish their land claims. The hilly and mountainous terrain of the Appalachians made the area unsuitable for the plantation-style agriculture of the lowlands and coastal area. It was settled largely by families from Tennessee, South Carolina, and Georgia.

This area was developed largely for subsistence farming, and few families held any slaves. For instance, in 1860, Bellefonte, Alabama, then the county seat and largest community in the county, had a population of 181, of whom eight were free blacks and the remainder were white. No slaves were recorded in that community.

The county is crossed by a number of rivers and waterways; the most important is the Tennessee River, which drains most of the county. The current county seat of Scottsboro developed along the river, and was also the site of a railroad station when railroads reached the area. Hydroelectric power was developed in the first quarter of the 20th century to generate energy for industry. By the mid-20th century, industry had replaced agriculture as the most important element of the economy.

== Geography ==
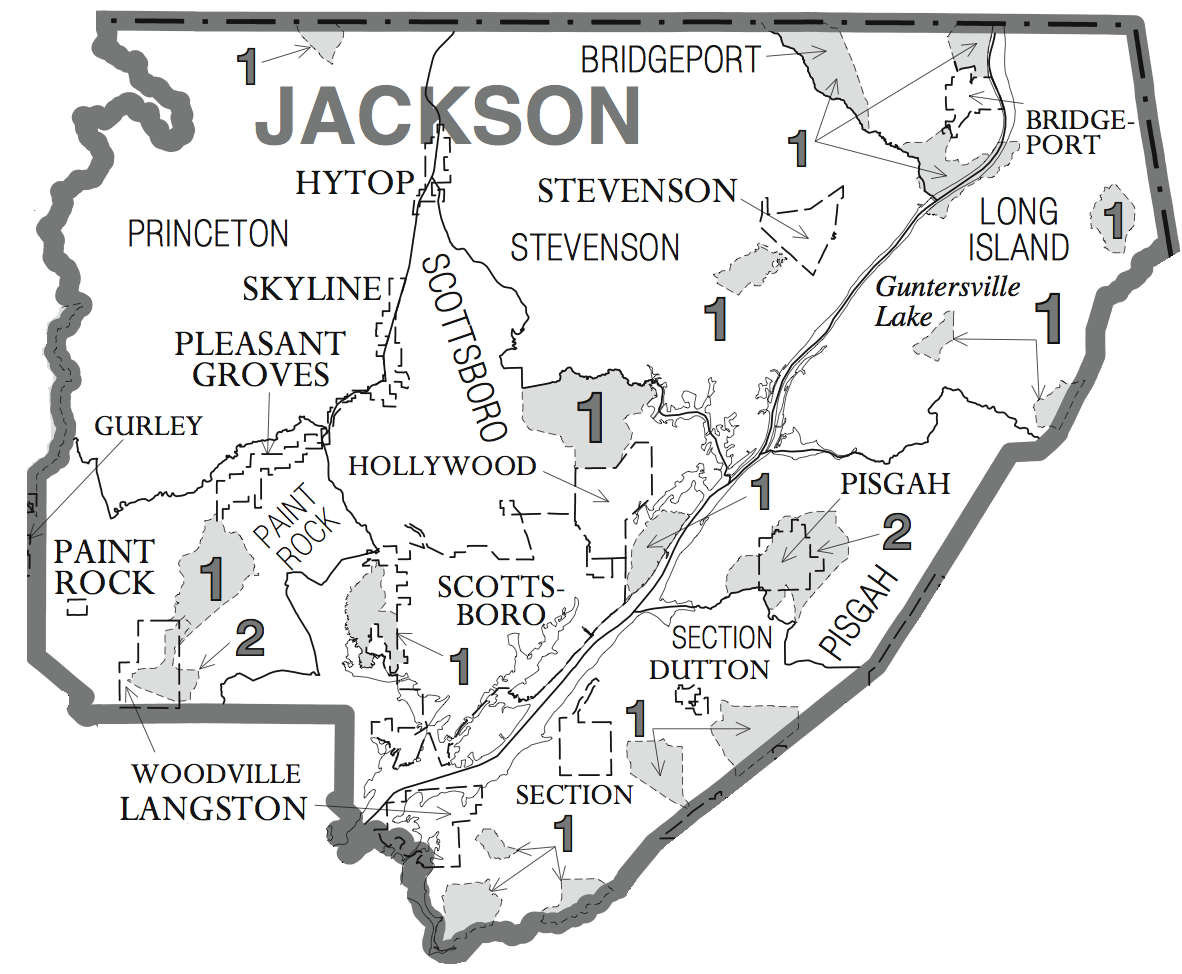
Map of Jackson County showing census subdivisions

According to the United States Census Bureau, the county has a total area of 1,127 square miles (2,920 km^{2}), of which 1,078 square miles (2,790 km^{2}) is land and 49 square miles (130 km^{2}) (%) is water. It is the fifth-largest county in Alabama by total area. Much of it is located in the Appalachians.

Of special interest is Russell Cave National Monument, which is located in Doran Cove, approximately 5 miles west of the town of Bridgeport. It is believed to offer "one of the most complete records of prehistoric culture in the southeast United States." Russell Cave was declared a National Monument in May 1961 by President John F. Kennedy. The Monument consists of 310 acres (1.3 km^{2}) of land donated by the National Geographic Society.

The cave is an important archaeological site that was excavated in 1956 by the Smithsonian Institution and the National Geographic Society. The October 1956 issue of National Geographic Magazine featured an article reporting, "Life 8,000 Years Ago Uncovered in an Alabama Cave." Evidence was found of human occupation of the cave from 6200 B.C. to A.D. 1650. The article was written by Carl F. Miller, the expedition leader. There have been follow-up studies about this site.

=== Adjacent counties ===
- Marion County, Tennessee – northeast
- Dade County, Georgia – east (EST)
- DeKalb County – southeast
- Marshall County – southwest
- Madison County – west
- Franklin County, Tennessee – northwest

=== National protected areas ===
- Fern Cave National Wildlife Refuge
- Russell Cave National Monument
- Sauta Cave National Wildlife Refuge

== Demographics ==
Historical population
Census	Pop.	Note	%±
1820	8,751		—
1830	12,700		45.1%
1840	15,715		23.7%
1850	14,088		−10.4%
1860	18,283		29.8%
1870	19,410		6.2%
1880	25,114		29.4%
1890	28,026		11.6%
1900	30,508		8.9%
1910	32,918		7.9%
1920	35,864		8.9%
1930	36,881		2.8%
1940	41,802		13.3%
1950	38,998		−6.7%
1960	36,681		−5.9%
1970	39,202		6.9%
1980	51,407		31.1%
1990	47,796		−7.0%
2000	53,926		12.8%
2010	53,227		−1.3%
2020	52,579		−1.2%
2025 (est.)	54,281	▲	3.2%
U.S. Decennial Census; 1790–1960 1900–1990; 1990–2000 2010–2020

=== Racial and ethnic composition ===
Limestone County, Alabama – Racial and ethnic composition Note: the US Census treats Hispanic/Latino as an ethnic category. This table excludes Latinos from the racial categories and assigns them to a separate category. Hispanics/Latinos may be of any race.
Race / Ethnicity (NH = Non-Hispanic)	Pop 1980	Pop 1990	Pop 2000	Pop 2010	Pop 2020	% 1980	% 1990	% 2000	% 2010	% 2020
White alone (NH)	48,687	44,531	49,200	47,937	45,123	94.71%	93.17%	91.24%	90.06%	85.82%
Black or African American alone (NH)	2,140	1,957	2,002	1,771	1,624	4.16%	4.09%	3.71%	3.33%	3.09%
Native American or Alaska Native alone (NH)	189	1,008	927	680	680	0.37%	2.11%	1.72%	1.28%	1.29%
Asian alone (NH)	42	89	123	165	214	0.08%	0.19%	0.23%	0.31%	0.41%
Native Hawaiian or Pacific Islander alone (NH)	x	x	9	29	2	x	x	0.02%	0.05%	0.00%
Other race alone (NH)	9	3	19	24	109	0.02%	0.01%	0.04%	0.05%	0.21%
Mixed race or Multiracial (NH)	x	x	1,036	1,282	3,146	x	x	1.92%	2.41%	5.98%
Hispanic or Latino (any race)	340	208	610	1,339	1,681	0.66%	0.44%	1.13%	2.52%	3.20%
Total	51,407	47,796	53,926	53,227	52,579	100.00%	100.00%	100.00%	100.00%	100.00%

=== 2020 census ===
As of the 2020 census, the county had a population of 52,579. The median age was 44.5 years. 20.6% of residents were under the age of 18 and 21.0% of residents were 65 years of age or older. For every 100 females there were 95.2 males, and for every 100 females age 18 and over there were 92.3 males age 18 and over.

The racial makeup of the county was 86.5% White, 3.1% Black or African American, 1.5% American Indian and Alaska Native, 0.4% Asian, 0.0% Native Hawaiian and Pacific Islander, 1.8% from some other race, and 6.8% from two or more races. Hispanic or Latino residents of any race comprised 3.2% of the population.

24.7% of residents lived in urban areas, while 75.3% lived in rural areas.

There were 21,733 households in the county, of which 27.9% had children under the age of 18 living with them and 26.9% had a female householder with no spouse or partner present. About 28.4% of all households were made up of individuals and 13.9% had someone living alone who was 65 years of age or older.

There were 24,627 housing units, of which 11.8% were vacant. Among occupied housing units, 74.5% were owner-occupied and 25.5% were renter-occupied. The homeowner vacancy rate was 1.4% and the rental vacancy rate was 8.9%.

=== 2010 census ===
As of the census of 2010, there were 21,615 households, out of which 31.50% had children under the age of 18 living with them, 59.00% were married couples living together, 10.50% had a female householder with no husband present, and 26.80% were non-families. Nearly 24.30% of all households were made up of individuals, and 10.50% had someone living alone who was 65 years of age or older. The average household size was 2.47, and the average family size was 2.92.

In the county, the population was spread out, with 24.20% under the age of 18, 8.30% from 18 to 24, 28.70% from 25 to 44, 25.40% from 45 to 64, and 13.40% who were 65 years of age or older. The median age was 38 years. For every 100 females, there were 95.10 males. For every 100 females age 18 and over, there were 92.00 males.

The median income for a household in the county was $32,020, and the median income for a family was $38,082. Males had a median income of $29,777 versus $20,990 for females. The per capita income for the county was $16,000. About 10.30% of families and 13.70% of the population were below the poverty line, including 17.20% of those under age 18 and 21.00% of those age 65 or over.

=== 2000 census ===
As of the census of 2000, there were 53,926 people, 21,615 households, and 15,822 families residing in the county. The population density was 50 people per square mile (19 people/km^{2}). There were 24,168 housing units at an average density of 22 units per square mile (8.5 units/km^{2}). The racial makeup of the county was 91.89% White (non-Hispanic), 3.74% Black or African American, 1.75% Native American, 0.23% Asian, 0.02% Pacific Islander, 0.36% from other races, and 2.00% from two or more races. 1.61% of the population were Hispanic or Latino of any race.

In 2000, the largest ancestry groups in Jackson County were English 69.1%, Scots-Irish 5.21%, Scottish 4.67%, and African 3.74%.

== Politics ==
While most of North Alabama became solidly Republican during the 1970s, Jackson County remained a stronghold of the Democratic Party for elections to local office up through the 2000s (however, like many Southern Democrats, the county's voters are not liberal). Until November 2012, Democrats were elected to Jackson County government. In that year's general election, two Republicans were elected to the Jackson County Commission—the first Republicans to serve on the Commission since Reconstruction.

There is now an all-Republican political delegation in Jackson County. Tommy Hanes and Ritchie Whorton represent the county in the Alabama House of Representatives. Steve Livingston serves Jackson County in the Alabama State Senate. In 2004, Jackson County voted for Republican George W. Bush over Democrat John Kerry. It was the first time Jackson County voters had chosen a Republican presidential candidate over a Democrat since 1972.

In 2008, Republican presidential nominee John McCain won the county with 67.7 percent of the vote. In 2010, Republican gubernatorial candidate Robert J. Bentley received 56% of the vote, Republican House candidate Mo Brooks received 55% of the vote, and incumbent Senator Richard Shelby received 70% in the county. However, Democratic politicians continued to be elected to local positions such as County Sheriff and the school board.

The current Jackson County Commission is headed by Chairman General Willie Nance Jr.

United States presidential election results for Jackson County, Alabama
Year	Republican		Democratic		Third party(ies)	
Year	No.	%	No.	%	No.	%
1824	6	4.00%	141	94.00%	3	2.00%
1828	6	0.55%	1,088	99.45%	0	0.00%
1832	0	0.00%	1,045	100.00%	0	0.00%
1836	89	5.19%	1,626	94.81%	0	0.00%
1840	57	2.59%	2,147	97.41%	0	0.00%
1844	87	4.73%	1,751	95.27%	0	0.00%
1848	136	7.88%	1,589	92.12%	0	0.00%
1852	83	6.71%	1,154	93.29%	0	0.00%
1856	0	0.00%	1,790	94.86%	97	5.14%
1860	0	0.00%	565	23.01%	1,890	76.99%
1868	539	25.42%	1,581	74.58%	0	0.00%
1872	675	29.51%	1,612	70.49%	0	0.00%
1876	694	20.51%	2,689	79.49%	0	0.00%
1880	599	16.57%	2,059	56.97%	956	26.45%
1884	1,052	29.13%	2,217	61.40%	342	9.47%
1888	1,022	30.36%	2,304	68.45%	40	1.19%
1892	0	0.00%	3,044	65.01%	1,638	34.99%
1896	675	15.41%	3,556	81.21%	148	3.38%
1900	1,694	45.90%	1,933	52.37%	64	1.73%
1904	666	28.26%	1,641	69.62%	50	2.12%
1908	469	23.89%	1,404	71.52%	90	4.58%
1912	229	10.16%	1,597	70.82%	429	19.02%
1916	567	22.48%	1,907	75.61%	48	1.90%
1920	1,483	36.95%	2,513	62.62%	17	0.42%
1924	885	30.42%	1,923	66.11%	101	3.47%
1928	3,081	58.72%	2,153	41.03%	13	0.25%
1932	938	23.13%	3,110	76.68%	8	0.20%
1936	926	21.13%	3,450	78.71%	7	0.16%
1940	945	19.80%	3,818	80.01%	9	0.19%
1944	1,026	25.65%	2,967	74.18%	7	0.18%
1948	603	25.69%	0	0.00%	1,744	74.31%
1952	1,272	25.65%	3,677	74.15%	10	0.20%
1956	1,868	28.10%	4,758	71.58%	21	0.32%
1960	2,036	29.73%	4,789	69.93%	23	0.34%
1964	2,730	46.47%	0	0.00%	3,145	53.53%
1968	1,191	10.92%	1,022	9.37%	8,695	79.71%
1972	6,202	65.91%	2,985	31.72%	223	2.37%
1976	3,913	25.53%	10,989	71.71%	423	2.76%
1980	4,897	34.48%	8,776	61.79%	530	3.73%
1984	6,730	46.15%	7,635	52.36%	217	1.49%
1988	6,090	44.55%	7,418	54.27%	161	1.18%
1992	5,711	30.19%	10,628	56.19%	2,577	13.62%
1996	5,650	36.32%	8,204	52.73%	1,704	10.95%
2000	8,475	47.33%	9,066	50.63%	365	2.04%
2004	11,534	56.76%	8,635	42.49%	152	0.75%
2008	14,083	67.47%	6,374	30.54%	417	2.00%
2012	14,439	69.98%	5,822	28.22%	371	1.80%
2016	16,672	79.45%	3,673	17.50%	639	3.05%
2020	19,670	83.22%	3,717	15.73%	249	1.05%
2024	20,073	85.21%	3,276	13.91%	207	0.88%

United States Senate election results for Jackson County, Alabama2
Year	Republican		Democratic		Third party(ies)	
Year	No.	%	No.	%	No.	%
2020	18,888	80.36%	4,587	19.52%	29	0.12%

United States Senate election results for Jackson County, Alabama3
Year	Republican		Democratic		Third party(ies)	
Year	No.	%	No.	%	No.	%
2022	11,617	86.94%	1,518	11.36%	227	1.70%

Alabama Gubernatorial election results for Jackson County
Year	Republican		Democratic		Third party(ies)	
Year	No.	%	No.	%	No.	%
2022	11,630	86.90%	1,386	10.36%	367	2.74%

== Transportation ==
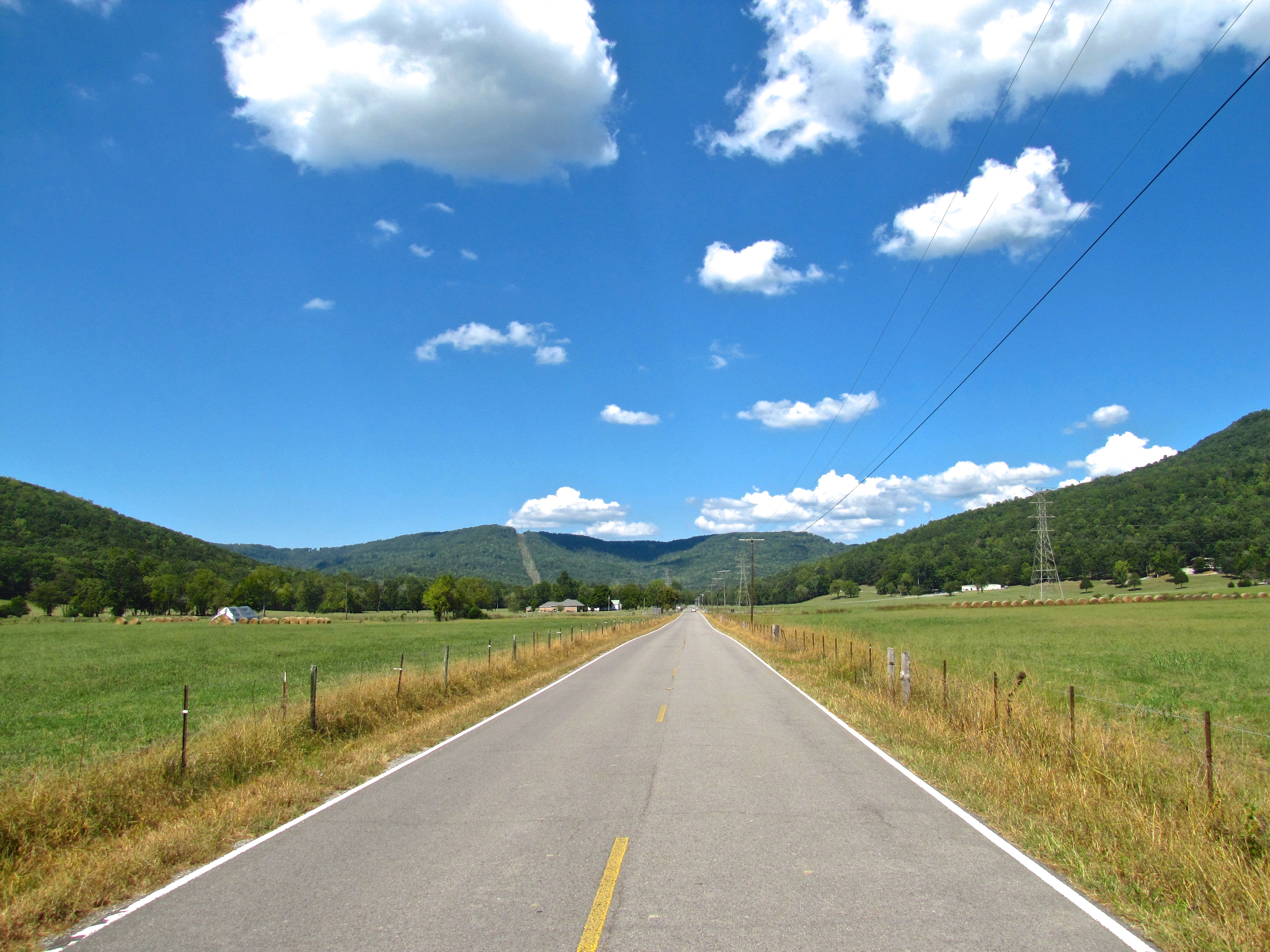
County Road 98 in northern Jackson County

=== Major highways ===
- U.S. Highway 72 / State Route 2 (unsigned)
- State Route 35
- State Route 40
- State Route 65
- State Route 71
- State Route 73
- State Route 79
- State Route 117
- State Route 146
- State Route 277
- State Route 279

=== Rail ===
- CSX Transportation
- Norfolk Southern Railway
- Sequatchie Valley Railroad

== Communities ==
=== Cities ===
- Bridgeport
- Scottsboro (county seat)
- Stevenson

=== Towns ===
- Dutton
- Hollywood
- Hytop
- Langston
- Paint Rock
- Pisgah
- Pleasant Groves
- Section
- Skyline
- Woodville

=== Unincorporated communities ===
- Baileytown
- Bass
- Bolivar
- Bryant
- Card Switch
- Estillfork
- Fackler
- Flat Rock
- Francisco
- Gorham's Bluff
- Higdon
- Hollytree
- Larkin
- Larkinsville
- Liberty Hill
- Lim Rock
- Long Island
- Pikeville
- Princeton
- Rash
- Rosalie
- Swaim
- Trenton

=== Ghost towns ===
- Bellefonte
- Little Nashville

== Education ==
The county has two school districts: Jackson County School District and Scottsboro City School District.

== See also ==
- National Register of Historic Places listings in Jackson County, Alabama
- Properties on the Alabama Register of Landmarks and Heritage in Jackson County, Alabama
