= Skyline, Alabama =

- Town
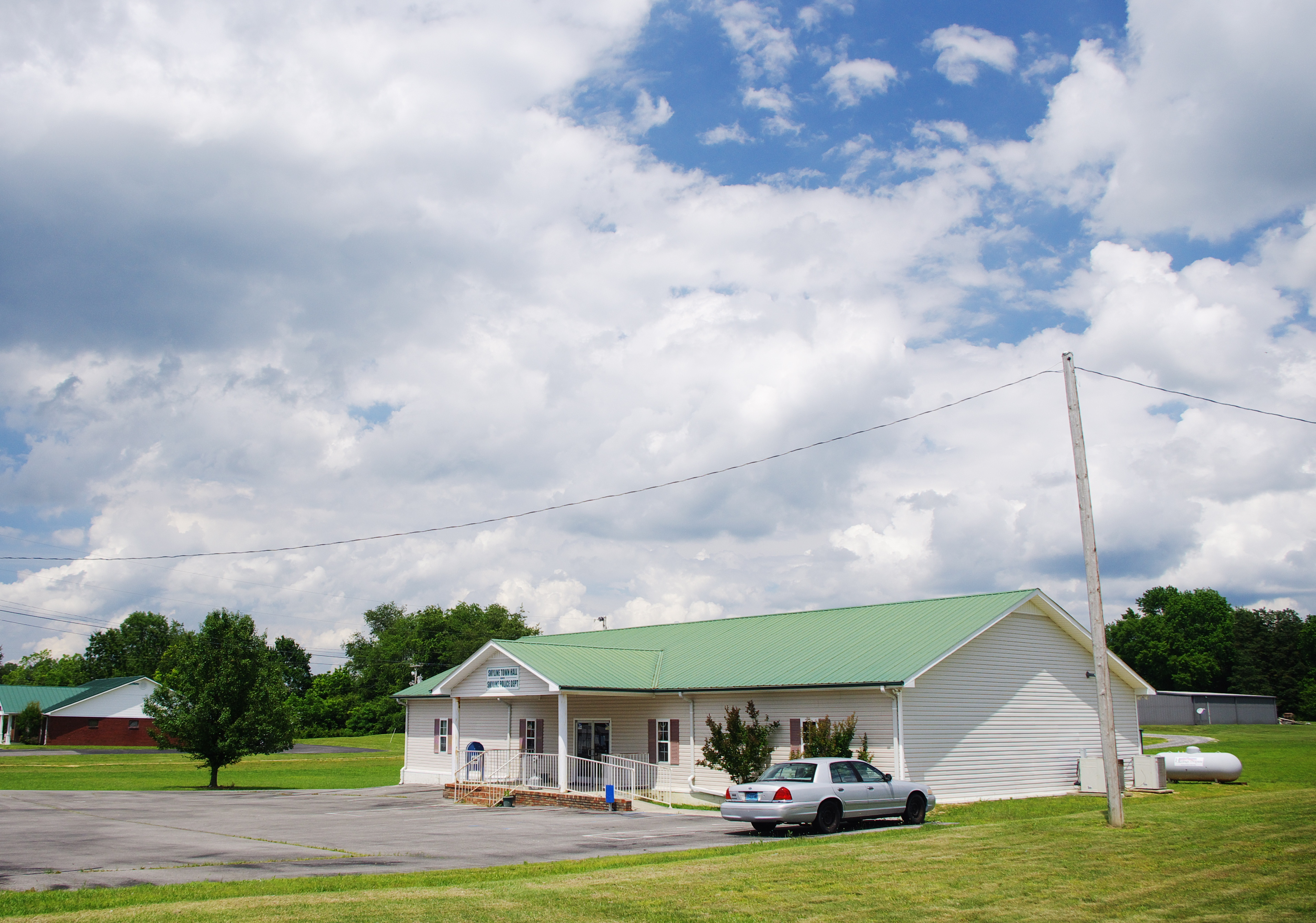
- Skyline Town Hall

- Location of Skyline in Jackson County, Alabama.
- Coordinates: 34°48′11″N 86°7′25″W
- Country: United States
- State: Alabama
- County: Jackson

Government
  - Mayor: Archie Rice

Area
  - Total: 3.99 sq mi (10.34 km^{2})
  - Land: 3.98 sq mi (10.31 km^{2})
  - Water: 0.012 sq mi (0.03 km^{2})
- Elevation: 1,591 ft (485 m)

Population (2020)
  - Total: 834
  - Density: 209.5/sq mi (80.88/km^{2})
- Time zone: UTC-6 (Central (CST))
  - Summer (DST): UTC-5 (CDT)
- Postal code: 35768
- Area code: 256
- FIPS code: 01-70896
- GNIS feature ID: 0139288

Skyline is a town in Jackson County, Alabama, United States. The town incorporated in 1985. As of the 2020 census, Skyline had a population of 834.

== History ==
Skyline began in 1934 as a cooperative farming experiment known as "Cumberland Farms" under President Franklin Roosevelt's Federal Emergency Relief Administration. This was one of 43 such projects attempted nationally in depressed areas. It was soon renamed "Skyline Farms" to avoid confusion with another project in neighboring Tennessee. The experiment lasted for a decade before being sold off to private buyers in 1944.

The current town of Skyline is located about a mile north of the original farming colony.

== Geography ==
Skyline is located at 34°48′11″N 86°7′25″W (34.802946, -86.123494). The town is situated atop the Cumberland Plateau in western Jackson County. The plateau towns of Hytop and Pleasant Groves lie to the north and southwest, respectively. State Route 79 traverses Skyline, connecting the town with Scottsboro in the valley to the south and Tennessee to the north. State Route 146 intersects SR 79 just north of Skyline, and connects the area with the Paint Rock Valley to the west.

According to the U.S. Census Bureau, the town has a total area of 3.9 square miles (10 km^{2}), all land.

== Demographics ==
Historical population
Census	Pop.	Note	%±
1990	740		—
2000	843		13.9%
2010	851		0.9%
2020	834		−2.0%
U.S. Decennial Census; 2013 Estimate

=== 2020 census ===
Skyline racial composition
Race	Num.	Perc.
White (non-Hispanic)	688	82.49%
Black or African American (non-Hispanic)	3	0.36%
Native American	27	3.24%
Other/Mixed	69	8.27%
Hispanic or Latino	47	5.64%

As of the 2020 United States census, there were 834 people, 367 households, and 258 families residing in the town.

=== 2000 census ===
As of the census of 2000, there were 843 people, 323 households, and 251 families residing in the town. The population density was 217.9 inhabitants per square mile (84.1/km^{2}). There were 357 housing units at an average density of 92.3 per square mile (35.6/km^{2}). The racial makeup of the town was 94.90% White, 2.73% Native American, 0.12% Asian, and 2.25% from two or more races. 0.71% of the population were Hispanic or Latino of any race.

There were 323 households, out of which 30.3% had children under the age of 18 living with them, 65.6% were married couples living together, 9.6% had a female householder with no husband present, and 22.0% were non-families. 19.8% of all households were made up of individuals, and 7.4% had someone living alone who was 65 years of age or older. The average household size was 2.61 and the average family size was 2.98.

In the town, the population was spread out, with 23.7% under the age of 18, 11.2% from 18 to 24, 27.4% from 25 to 44, 25.7% from 45 to 64, and 12.0% who were 65 years of age or older. The median age was 38 years. For every 100 females, there were 98.4 males. For every 100 females age 18 and over, there were 93.7 males.

The median income for a household in the town was $29,250, and the median income for a family was $31,985. Males had a median income of $28,026 versus $20,341 for females. The per capita income for the town was $12,780. About 9.4% of families and 13.7% of the population were below the poverty line, including 12.1% of those under age 18 and 22.0% of those age 65 or over.
