= Paint Rock River =

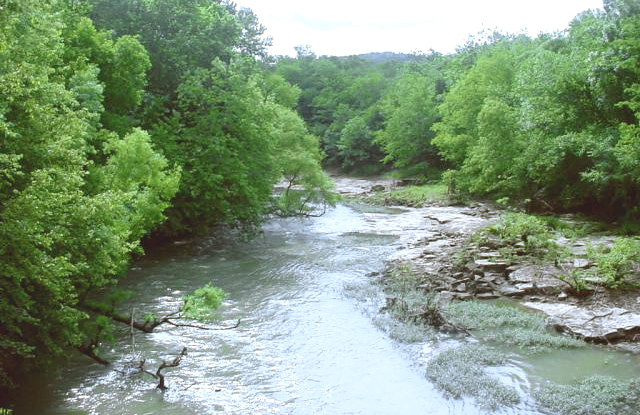
- The Paint Rock River near Woodville, Alabama

Location
- Country: United States
- State: Alabama

Physical characteristics
- Source
  - coordinates: 34.89814°N 86.17053°W
- Mouth
  - coordinates: 34.47620°N 86.46776°W
- Length: 58.7 mi (94.5 km)
- Discharge
  - location: Woodville, AL
  - average: 667 cu/ft. per sec.

The Paint Rock River is a 58.7-mile-long (94.5 km) tributary of the Tennessee River in northern Alabama in the United States. Its tributaries also drain a portion of south-central Tennessee.

The river is formed in northeastern Jackson County by the confluence of Estill Fork and Hurricane Creek, and flows generally southwardly, past the town of Paint Rock. In its upper course, the river flows through a deep valley cut into the Cumberland Plateau. In its lower course, the river is used to define part of the boundary between Madison and Marshall Counties.

== Nature preserves ==
There are multiple nature preserves along the Paint Rock river.

The Paint Rock River National Wildlife Refuge is a 87-acre federally protected nature reserve along the Tennessee-Alabama border that protects the Paint Rock River's watershed and tributaries.

The Paint Rock River flows along the western side of the Fern Cave National Wildlife Refuge.

Through its Forever Wild program, the Alabama Department of Conservation and Natural Resources owns 1,500-acres of land along upper part of the Paint Rock River. The land was purchased to protect endangered species of fish an mussels that live in the river.

=== Roy B. Whitaker Preserve ===
The Roy B. Whitaker Paint Rock River Preserve is a 323-acre nature preserve along the Paint Rock River that is managed by The Nature Conservancy. The preserve is a part of the North Alabama Birding Trail.

== Biodiversity ==
Over 100 species of fish live in the Paint Rock River. The Paint Rock River is the only river in Alabama where two endangered species of fish, the Snail darter and the Palezone shiner, can be found.

About 45 species of mussels live in the paint Rock River. Two of these species, Toxolasma cylindrellus and Lampsilis virescens, are only known to be found in the Paint Rock River.

== See also ==
- List of Alabama rivers

== Bibliography ==
- DeLorme (1998). Alabama Atlas & Gazetteer. Yarmouth, Maine: DeLorme. ISBN 0-89933-274-9.
- U.S. Geological Survey Geographic Names Information System: Paint Rock River
