= U.S. Route 411 =

Numbered U.S. Highway in Alabama, Georgia, and Tennessee in the United States

U.S. Route 411
- US 411 highlighted in red

Route information
- Auxiliary route of US 11
- Length: 309.7 mi (498.4 km)
- Existed: 1934–present

Major junctions
- South end: US 78 / SR 25 in Leeds, AL
- I-20 in Leeds, AL; I-759 in Gadsden, AL; US 278 / US 431 in Gadsden, AL; US 27 / SR 1 in Rome, GA; I-75 / US 41 / SR 3 in Cartersville, GA; US 76 / SR 52 in Chatsworth, GA; US 64 / US 74 at Ocoee, TN; US 129 / US 321 in Maryville, TN; US 441 in Sevierville, TN
- North end: US 25W / US 70 in Newport, TN

Location
- Country: United States
- States: Alabama, Georgia, Tennessee
- Counties: AL: Jefferson, St. Clair, Etowah, Cherokee GA: Floyd, Bartow, Gordon, Murray TN: Polk, McMinn, Monroe, Loudon, Blount, Sevier, Jefferson, Cocke

Highway system
- United States Numbered Highway System; List; Special; Divided
← SR 378	AL	→ I-422
← SR 24	AL SR 25	→ SR 26
← SR 410	GA	→ SR 411
← I-20	GA SR 20	→ SR 21
← SR 52	GA SR 53	→ SR 54
← SR 60	GA SR 61	→ SR 62
← SR 400	TN	→ US 412
← SR 32	TN SR 33	→ SR 34
← SR 34	TN SR 35	→ SR 36

U.S. Route 411 (US 411) is an alternate parallel-highway associated with US 11. It extends for about 309.7 miles (498.4 km) from US 78 in Leeds, Alabama, to US 25W/US 70 in Newport, Tennessee. US 411 travels through northeastern Alabama, northwestern Georgia, and southeastern Tennessee. It is signed north-south, as with most highways that have odd numbers, but the route runs primarily in a northeast-southwest direction, and covers a more east-west mileage than it does north-south. Notable towns and cities along its route include Gadsden, Alabama; Rome, Georgia; Cartersville, Georgia; Maryville, Tennessee; Sevierville, Tennessee, and Newport, Tennessee.

US 411 and US 11 never intersect with one another, though they come very close in various places including Leeds, Alabama, Gadsden, Alabama, and Maryville, Tennessee. US 411 also spends much of its route close to the Interstate Highway System: Interstate 20 (I-20), I-40, I-75, and I-59, though it never has an interchange with I-59.

Most of the terrain through which US 411 passes is rural countryside, with no major metropolitan areas directly along its route. However, it does pass relatively near the major cities of Birmingham, Alabama, Chattanooga, Tennessee and Knoxville, Tennessee. In Sevier County, Tennessee, south of Knoxville, US 411 is used by many tourists as a route to the northern side of the Great Smoky Mountains National Park. US 411 passes approximately 20 miles (32 km) north of the national park, but intersects with US 441, which actually goes through this park. Although US 411 has a south–north designation, it contains long stretches that are west–east, and its overall direction is actually southwest–northeast.

US 411 is generally a two-lane highway through the countryside. However, it has long been a four-lane, divided highway connecting Rome and Cartersville, Georgia, and it is a multi-lane highway connecting Cartersville with I-75. Also, for part of its route in the Cartersville area, US 411 shares a four-lane, divided highway with US 41. Furthermore, the Tennessee Department of Transportation completed a project to widen the highway to four lanes between Maryville and Ocoee, Tennessee, and between Chestnut Hill and Newport, Tennessee.

== Route description ==
Lengths
	mi	km
AL	88.4	142.3
GA	99.9	160.8
TN	121.4	195.4
Total	309.7	498.4

=== Alabama ===
US 411 begins at US 78 (Parkway Drive) in the city of Leeds in far eastern Jefferson County. SR 25, the U.S. Highway's companion route, continues south as a signed highway that briefly follows US 78 east before splitting south toward Harpersville; however, mileposts along US 411 in Alabama generally reflect SR 25. US 411 heads north along two-lane 9th Street, which has a pair of at-grade crossings of Norfolk Southern Railway rail lines. The street's name changes to Whitmire Street, which the U.S. Highway follows to Ashville Road. US 411 follows Ashville Road, a two-lane road with a center turn lane, northeast into St. Clair County, where the highway expands to four lanes. The U.S. Highway meets I-20 at a partial cloverleaf interchange as it leaves the city of Leeds. US 411 continues as two-lane Moody Parkway northeast through the Cahaba Valley formed by the Little Cahaba River between Pine Ridge to the west and Oak Ridge to the east. The highway has a brief concurrency with SR 174 through Odenville, where the highways pass under a CSX rail line.

US 411 continues northeast through the Beaver Creek Valley between Pine Ridge and the Beaver Creek Mountains. The highway leaves the valley after it joins US 231 (Heart of Dixie Highway) to pass through Pine Ridge to the city of Ashville. The U.S. Highways enter town along 5th Street and proceed to the county courthouse, where they meet the eastern end of SR 23 (6th Avenue). Both highways turn east onto 6th Avenue, then US 231 turns north onto Court Street East. US 411 leaves Ashville along Rainbow Drive, which heads northeast between Big Canoe Creek and Canoe Creek Mountain to the south. The U.S. Highway crosses the mountain and enters Etowah County where it crosses the Big Canoe Creek branch of Neely Henry Lake. US 411 follows the western flank of Dunaway mountain to Rainbow City, where the route intersects SR 77 (Grand Avenue).

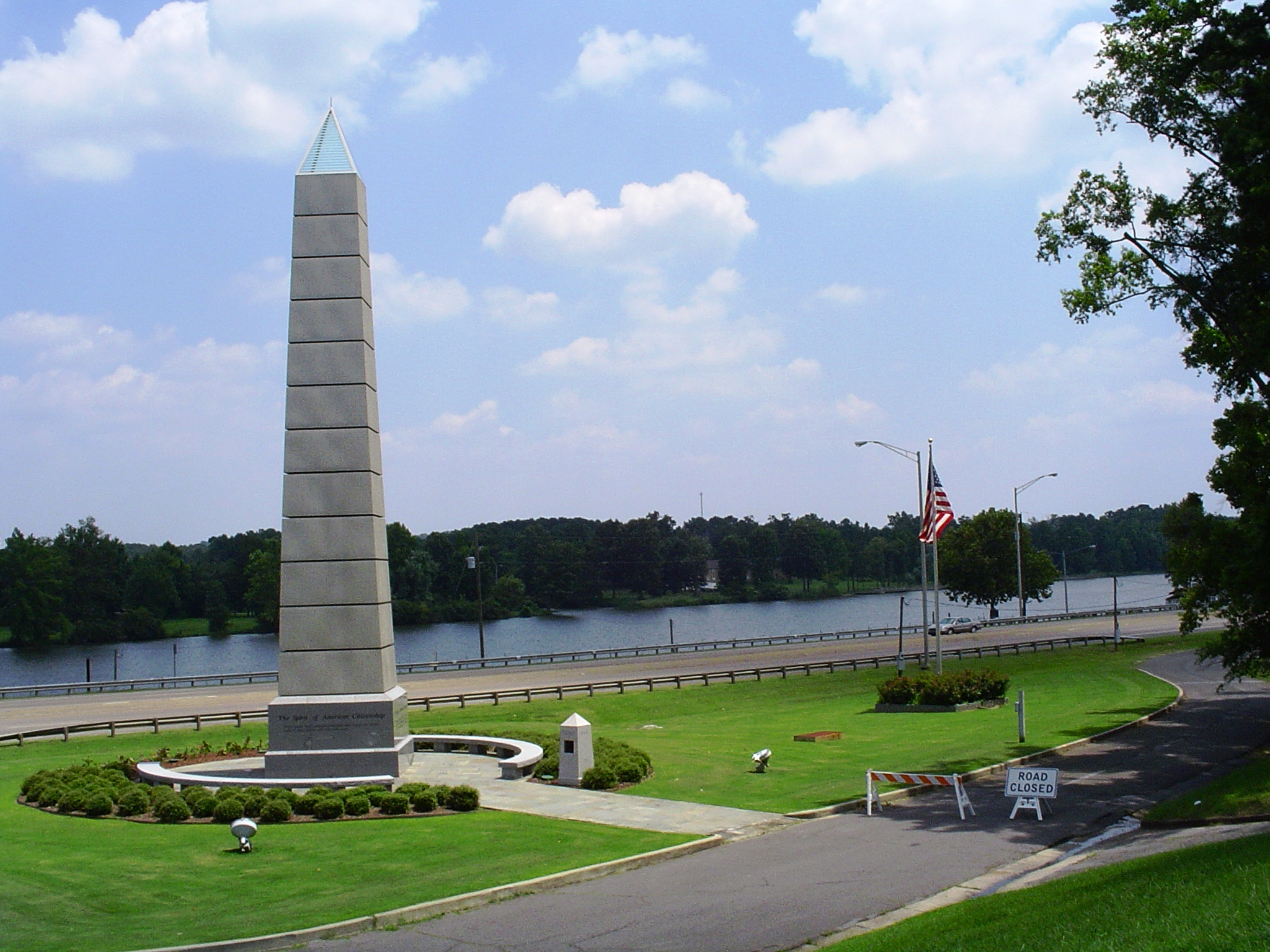
Spirit of American Citizenship Monument on the Coosa River in Gadsden, Alabama

US 411 expands to a four-lane divided highway as it enters the city of Gadsden. The highway crosses the Big Wills Creek branch of Neely Henry Lake and meets the eastern end of I-759 at a partial cloverleaf interchange; that freeway continues east as SR 759. US 411 veers onto Albert Rains Boulevard, which follows the right bank of the Coosa River through downtown Gadsden. The highway passes by the Spirit of American Citizenship Monument and under Broad Street, an Omnitrax rail line, and US 278 and US 431 (Meighan Boulevard), which access US 411 via a partial cloverleaf interchange. US 411 leaves (or will soon exit) Gadsden along a newly constructed four-lane divided highway that passes between Shinbone Ridge to the west and several loops of the Coosa River. The U.S. Highway drops to two lanes before it enters Cherokee County, then expands again to a four-lane divided highway, Weiss Lake Boulevard.

US 411 curves east along the northern edge of Weiss Lake and intersects SR 68 (Industrial Boulevard) in the town of Leesburg, east of which US 411 and SR 68 cross the lake, an impoundment of the Coosa River. Shortly after entering the city of Centre, the U.S. Highway and state highway turn onto the Clarence E. Chestnut Jr. Bypass, a four-lane road with center turn lane; US 411 Business and SR 25 continue along Main Street into the center of town. SR 68 diverges from the U.S. Highway at Cedar Bluff Road, which carries SR 283 southwest toward downtown. SR 283 becomes US 411's companion route on the bypass, which next intersects SR 9 (Armory Road), which intersects SR 68 immediately to the north. US 411 drops to two lanes east of SR 9 and curves south to collect the east end of US 411 Business (Main Street) and SR 25 on the eastern edge of Centre. US 411 continues east and crosses Cowan Creek before reaching the Alabama–Georgia state line and the northern terminus of SR 25 east of the hamlet of Forney.

=== Georgia ===
US 411 enters Georgia at the western terminus of its companion SR 53 in the southwestern corner of Floyd County. The two-lane highway, which is named Gadsden Road, has a brief concurrency with SR 100, which heads north as Fosters Mill Road and south as Mill Street, on the west side of the town of Cave Spring. US 411 enters town along Alabama Street and leaves to the northeast along Rome Street. The U.S. Highway continues as Cave Spring Road, which crosses Cedar Creek and passes through Vans Valley. US 411 passes under the West Rome Bypass and intersects US 27 and SR 1 (Cedartown Highway), which US 411 joins heading north. The four-lane road with center turn lane passes along the west side of Lindale and between Walker Mountain and Booze Mountain on the west and east, respectively.

US 411 and US 27 expand to a divided highway as they enter the city of Rome and then a four-lane freeway as they cross over a Norfolk Southern rail line. The freeway has a diamond interchange with Darlington Drive and Old Lindale Road and a half-diamond interchange with Maple Road. Immediately to the east of the second interchange, US 411 passes through a directional T interchange; US 27, SR 1, SR 20, and SR 53 head north toward downtown Rome and US 411 and SR 20 head east. Immediately to the east of the split, the U.S. Highway has a partial cloverleaf interchange with SR 101 (Dean Avenue); there is no ramp from SR 101 to westbound US 411. The freeway ends east of SR 101. US 411 has an intersection with the southern end of SR 1 Loop (East Rome Bypass) before leaving the city limits.

US 411 heads east along Cartersville Highway into Bartow County. The four-lane divided highway parallels and then crosses the Etowah River. US 411 crosses over an east–west CSX rail line immediately before its trumpet interchange with US 41 and SR 3 (Joe Frank Harris Parkway). The two U.S. Highways head southeast into the city of Cartersville then diverge immediately to the east of a north–south CSX rail line at the boulevard's partial cloverleaf interchange with SR 61 (Tennessee Street). Immediately to the north of the interchange, SR 20 (Canton Highway) splits east and SR 61 becomes US 411's companion highway toward Tennessee. The U.S. Highway heads north as a four-lane undivided highway that becomes divided temporarily through the highway's partial cloverleaf interchange with I-75 (Larry McDonald Memorial Highway).

US 411 drops to two lanes south of the town of White, where the highway begins to closely parallel the north–south CSX rail line. The U.S. Highway intersects SR 140 (Henry Mack Hill Road) in the hamlet of Rydal before entering Gordon County. US 411 passes through the town of Fairmount as Salacoa Street; the U.S. Highway runs concurrently with SR 53 between Calhoun Street and Fairmount Highway. North of the town of Ranger, through which the route is named Tennessee Highway, the highway meets the eastern end of SR 156 (Red Bud Road). US 411 passes through the town of Oakman, then diverges from a road called Old Highway 411, crosses to the west side of the railroad, intersects SR 136 (Nicklesville Road), and enters Murray County. The U.S. Highway passes to the west of Reregulation Reservoir and Carters Lake, both impoundments of the Coosawattee River, which the highway crosses to the west of the lakes.

US 411 intersects US 76 and SR 282 at Ramhurst, which follow part of Old Highway 411 before heading east through the Cohutta Mountains, and begins to follow the path of the Old Federal Road through Cherokee country, widening to four undivided lanes along the west flank of Fort Mountain. US 411 and US 76 continue as 3rd Avenue through the city of Chatsworth. In the center of town, the highways intersect Fort Street, which carries SR 2 and SR 52 east toward Fort Mountain and State Route 52 Alternate to the west. At the north end of town, US 76 and SR 52 leave US 411 along G.I. Maddox Boulevard. The U.S. Highway passes along the west flank of Camp Ground Mountain and is named Hill Street through the town of Eton, where the route meets the eastern end of SR 286 (Coffey Road) and drops to two lanes. US 411 passes through the town of Crandall, crosses to the east side of the railroad, and follows the Fairy Valley to the hamlet of Cisco, where SR 2 splits to the west. US 411 crosses over to the west side of the rail line in the hamlet of Tennga immediately before reaching the Georgia–Tennessee state line, where SR 61 has its northern terminus.

=== Tennessee ===
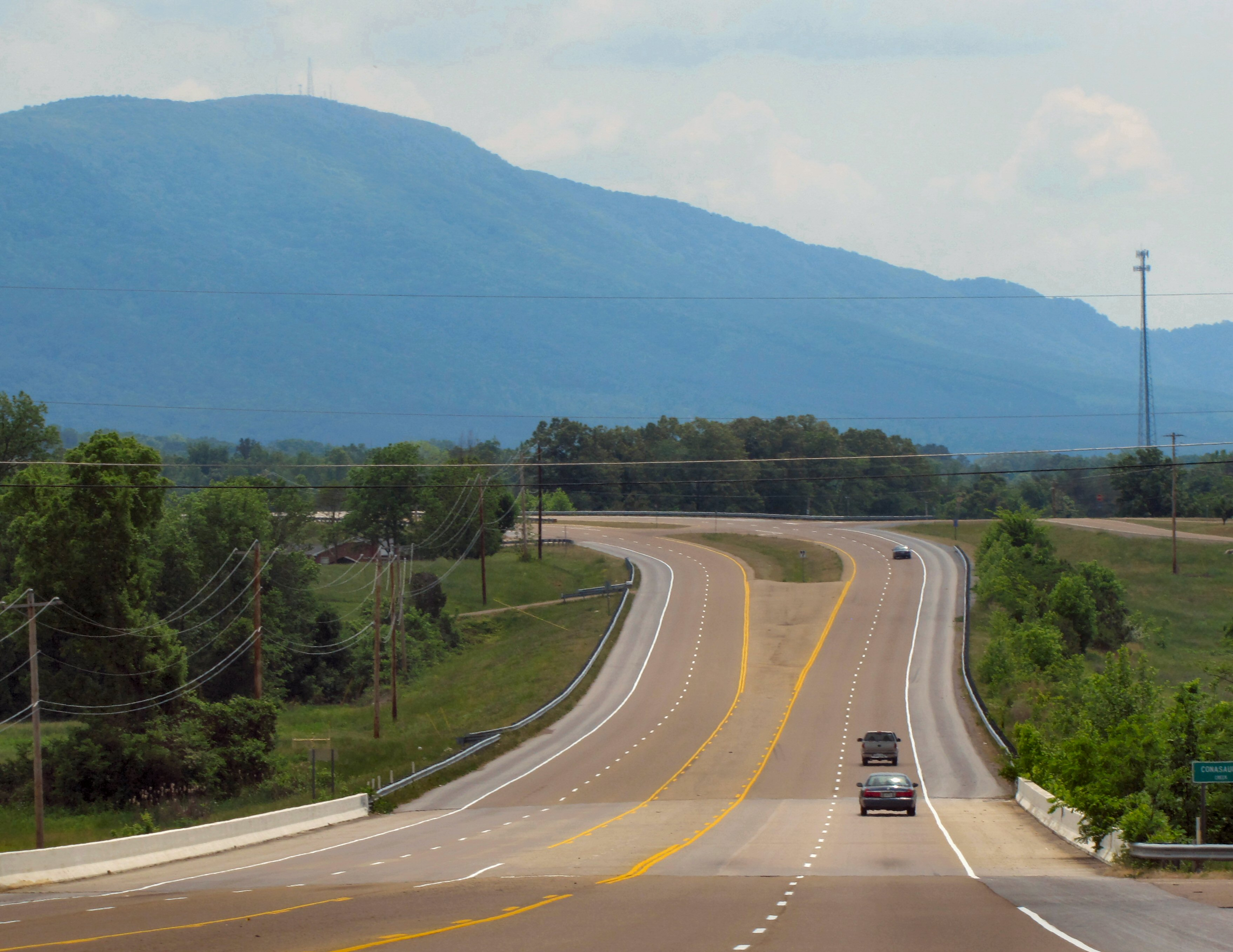
US 411 crossing Conasauga Creek, near Etowah, Tennessee

US 411 enters Tennessee at the southern terminus of its companion SR 33 in the southwestern corner of Polk County. The highway crosses the Conasauga River in the hamlet of Conasauga and meets the eastern end of SR 313 (Ladd Springs Road) in Oldfort. US 411 parallels the CSX rail line through the hamlet of Ocoee, where the highway expands to four lanes plus a center turn lane and has a partial cloverleaf interchange with US 64 and US 74 (SR 40). North of Ocoee, US 411 crosses over the railroad and the Ocoee River and passes through the town of Benton, where the route meets the northern end of SR 314 (Parksville Road). The U.S. Highway expands to a divided highway north of the town. US 411 intersects and begins to run concurrently with SR 30, crosses the Hiwassee River, passes by Hiwassee/Ocoee Scenic River State Park, and meets the eastern end of SR 163 in the village of Delano.

US 411 becomes undivided and crosses over the CSX rail line shortly after entering McMinn County. In the town of Etowah, the highway follows Tennessee Avenue, meets the western end of SR 310 (Mecca Pike), and SR 30 splits west along David M. Lilliard Memorial Highway. The highway becomes divided once again north of town and continues through farmland and countryside before becoming undivided once again before entering the town of Englewood. Here, the highway goes through town passing just east of the downtown area and intersecting and having a short concurrency with SR 39 (Athens Pike; Tellico Street). US 411 then becomes a divided highway again as it leaves Englewood and enters countryside once again before crossing into Monroe County.

US 411 continues through countryside before entering the city of Madisonville. Here, it becomes undivided for a short distance before having an intersection with its former alignment, which travels through downtown (Old US Highway 411), before becoming divided and having a partial cloverleaf interchange with SR 68 (New Highway 68). This provides access to Sweetwater, The Lost Sea, Tellico Plains, Cherohala Skyway and the Cherokee National Forest. US 411 then proceeds along a bypass of downtown as a divided highway passing through a major business district. It then has a grade-separated interchange with its former alignment (Warren Street) before becoming undivided. The highway then leaves Madisonville and continues north as a four-lane divided highway through farmland and countryside. US 411 then comes to an intersection and becomes concurrent with SR 72 (Loudon Highway) just before entering the town of Vonore (the northern terminus of the Old Federal Road) and becoming undivided once again as this time it passes straight through downtown. It intersects SR 360, which provides access to Fort Loudoun and Fort Loudoun State Park and then divides before it crosses the bridge over the Little Tennessee River/Tellico Lake into Loudon County. Here SR 72 turns toward the mountains. Along the southeast edge of Greenback the road becomes undivided again and is known as Greenback Road, passing SR 95 which provides access to downtown Greenback. US 411 then continues through countryside and farmland to cross into Blount County.

US 411 continues through farmland as an undivided four-lane highway and has an intersection with SR 336 northeast of the community of Lanier. It then continues through farmland before entering the city of Maryville and becoming concurrent with US 129 (SR 115) (Calderwood Highway; provides access to Calderwood, Tallassee, and Deals Gap). It passes by a few businesses before really entering the business district at the intersection with SR 335 (William Blount Drive). They continue through a major business district before coming to a grade-separated interchange where US 411 and US 129 split, with US 129 bypassing downtown to enter Alcoa and providing access to McGhee Tyson Airport and Knoxville. US 411 continues north into downtown next to Foothills Mall. US 411 continues into downtown, as Broadway Avenue, and comes to an intersection with US 321 (SR 73) (Lamar Alexander Parkway; provides access to Walland, Townsend, Wears Valley, and Great Smoky Mountains National Park). It then has another intersection with SR 336 before traveling through the center and most historic part of the city and coming to an intersection with SR 35 (Hall Road/Washington Street). SR 33 continues north to Knoxville here, and US 411 turns right to become concurrent with SR 35 (its new companion route). It follows Washington Street for a short distance before turning left onto Sevierville Road, at an intersection with SR 447 (Washington Street), and leaves downtown. It then passes by Blount Memorial Hospital before going through some neighborhoods and leaving Maryville. US 411 continues as a narrow two-lane highway through countryside and farmland and crosses the Little River in the community of Wildwood. It then continues through countryside and farmland, passing by 411 Speedway, before entering the city of Seymour and Sevier County.

US 411 goes through neighborhoods in Seymour for about 1.5 miles (2.4 km) before coming to an intersection with US 441 (SR 71; Chapman Highway; provides access to Knoxville) and SR 338 (Boyds Creek Highway; provides access to Kodak and Douglas Dam). Here, US 411/SR 35 turn right to become concurrent with US 441/SR 71 and continue as an undivided four-lane highway through Seymour. Upon leaving Seymore, the highways traverse the Slate Knobs, the eastern foothills of Chilhowee Mountain, and becoming narrow and curvy while maintaining four lanes throughout. After several miles the road widens to a four-lane divided highway and stays that way until it enters the city of Sevierville where it becomes undivided once again. From Seymour to Sevierville, US 411 and US 441 run together in a wrong-way concurrency; highway route signs once gave the conflicting directions. The route crosses the Little Pigeon River and enters downtown at the intersection with SR 66/Great Smoky Mountains Parkway (Winfield Dunn Parkway; provides access to I-40), where US 441/SR 71 split southward, as Forks of the River Parkway, to go to Pigeon Forge, Gatlinburg, and the Great Smoky Mountains National Park. US 411/SR 35 continue through downtown as Main Street and has an intersection with SR 448 (North Parkway/Parkway; also part of Great Smoky Mountains Parkway) before leaving downtown at the crossing of Middle Creek, where it transitions to Dolly Parton Parkway. It continues through a major business district and has an intersection with SR 449 (Veterans Boulevard; provides access to Dollywood and Pigeon Forge). It then passes by some more businesses before leaving Sevierville and entering the community of Cherokee Hills, near the intersection with SR 416 (Pittman Center Road; provides access to Pittman Center and Gatlinburg). It then has an intersection with SR 339 (Long Springs Road; provides access to Cosby) before leaving Cherokee Hills and narrowing to an improved two-lane Highway. US 411 then passes through the community of New Center before having a sharp switchback and becoming narrow prior to crossing into Jefferson County.

After crossing the county line, US 411 immediately enters the community of Chestnut Hill and has an intersection with SR 92 next to the Bush Bean Museum, which also right across the road from the cannery plant and corporate headquarters of Bush Brothers and Company. US 411 then enters some mountains and becomes curvy for a short distance before widening to a new four-lane divided highway just before crossing into Cocke County.

US 411 continues along the new four-lane highway into the city of Newport and ends at its national northern terminus at an intersection with US 25W/US 70 (SR 9) just a short distance away from that route's interchange with I-40 (Exit 432 A-B; though exit 432 A is only signed as US 411 on the Interstate in both directions), with SR 35 turning right to become concurrent with, though unsigned, that route towards downtown.

=== National Highway System ===
The following portions of US 411 are part of the National Highway System, a system of routes determined to be the most important for the nation's economy, mobility, and defense:

- From the southern part of Rainbow City, Alabama, through Gadsden, to a point southwest of Turkey Town
- From the southern end of the US 27/SR 1 concurrency in Six Mile, Georgia, through Rome and Cartersville, to McCallie
- The entire length of the US 76 concurrency, from south-southeast of Chatsworth, into the city
- From the Georgia–Tennessee state line, in Tennga, to the bridge over the Little River, northeast of Maryville, Tennessee

== Major intersections ==
State	County	Location	mi	km	Destinations	Notes
Alabama	Jefferson	Leeds	0.000	0.000	US 78 / SR 25 south (SR 4 / Parkway Drive) – Irondale, Pell City, Harpersville	Southern terminus; southern end of SR 25 concurrency; SR 25 continues as a signed highway south of US 411.
Alabama	St. Clair	Leeds	2.118	3.409	I-20 – Birmingham, Atlanta	I-20 exit 144
Alabama	St. Clair	Odenville	12.428	20.001	SR 174 east – Pell City	Southern end of SR 174 concurrency
Alabama	St. Clair	Odenville	13.430	21.613	SR 174 west – Springville	Northern end of SR 174 concurrency
Alabama	St. Clair		23.113	37.197	US 231 south (Heart of Dixie Highway / SR 53 south) – Pell City	Southern end of US 231 concurrency
Alabama	St. Clair	Ashville	27.211	43.792	SR 23 south (6th Avenue) – Springville	Northern terminus of SR 23
Alabama	St. Clair	Ashville	27.235	43.830	US 231 north (Court Street East / SR 53 north) – Oneonta	Northern end of US 231 concurrency
Alabama	Etowah	Rainbow City	43.215	69.548	SR 77 (Grand Avenue) – Attalla, Talladega	
Alabama	Etowah	Gadsden	46.767	75.264	I-759 west / SR 759 east – Birmingham, Chattanooga	I-759 exit 4; eastern terminus of I-759; western terminus of SR 759
Alabama	Etowah	Gadsden	48.306	77.741	US 278 / US 431 (Meighan Boulevard / SR 1 / SR 74) – Albertville, Cullman, Anniston, Piedmont	Partial cloverleaf interchange
Alabama	Cherokee	Leesburg	66.460	106.957	SR 68 west (Industrial Boulevard) – Collinsville	Southern end of SR 68 concurrency
Alabama	Cherokee	Centre	69.780	112.300	US 411 Bus. north (Main Street)	Northern end of SR 25 concurrency
Alabama	Cherokee	Centre	71.994	115.863	SR 68 north / SR 283 south (Cedar Bluff Road) – Cedar Bluff	Northern end of SR 68 concurrency; southern end of SR 283 concurrency
Alabama	Cherokee	Centre	72.143	116.103	SR 9 (Armory Road) – Cedar Bluff, Piedmont	
Alabama	Cherokee	Centre	74.353	119.660	US 411 Bus. south (Main Street)	Southern end of SR 25 concurrency; northern terminus of SR 283
Alabama	Cherokee	Forney	88.397	142.261	SR 25 ends	Northern end of SR 25 concurrency; northern terminus of SR 25
			88.397 0.0	142.261 0.0	Alabama–Georgia state line	
Georgia	Floyd	Haney	0.0	0.0	SR 53 begins	Western end of SR 53 concurrency; western terminus of SR 53
Georgia	Floyd	Cave Spring	4.4	7.1	SR 100 north (Fosters Mill Road) – Summerville	Southern end of SR 100 concurrency
Georgia	Floyd	Cave Spring	5.1	8.2	SR 100 south (Mill Street) – Cedartown	Northern end of SR 100 concurrency
Georgia	Floyd	Six Mile	14.9	24.0	US 27 south / SR 1 south – Cedartown, Georgia Highlands College	Southern end of US 27/SR 1 concurrency
Georgia	Floyd	Rome	17.5	28.2	Darlington Drive / Old Lindale Road	Interchange
Georgia	Floyd	Rome	18.3	29.5	Maple Road	Southbound exit and northbound entrance; interchange
Georgia	Floyd	Rome	20.1	32.3	US 27 north / SR 1 north / SR 53 north / SR 20 west – Rome	Northern end of US 27/SR 1 and SR 53 concurrencies; southern end of SR 20 concurrency; interchange
Georgia	Floyd	Rome	20.3	32.7	SR 101 (Dean Avenue) – Rockmart	No southbound entrance; interchange
Georgia	Floyd	Rome	21.9	35.2	SR 1 Loop north to SR 293 – Calhoun, Summerville, Baseball Stadium, Chieftains Museum Major Ridge Home	Southern terminus of SR 1 Loop
Georgia	Bartow		38.2	61.5	US 41 north / SR 3 north – Adairsville, Calhoun, Kingston	Southern end of US 41/SR 3 concurrency; interchange
Georgia	Bartow	Cartersville	41.6	66.9	US 41 south / SR 3 south / SR 61 south (Tennessee Street)	Northern end of US 41/SR 3 concurrency; southern end of SR 61 concurrency
Georgia	Bartow	Cartersville	42.1	67.8	SR 20 east to I-75 – Canton	Northern end of SR 20 concurrency
Georgia	Bartow	Cartersville	45.1	72.6	I-75 (SR 401) – Chattanooga, Atlanta	I-75 exit 293
Georgia	Bartow	Rydal	52.8	85.0	SR 140 – Adairsville, Canton	
Georgia	Gordon	Fairmount	59.7	96.1	SR 53 west (Calhoun Street) – Calhoun	Southern end of SR 53 concurrency
Georgia	Gordon	Fairmount	60.1	96.7	SR 53 east (Fairmount Highway) – Jasper, Ellijay	Northern end of SR 53 concurrency
Georgia	Gordon		66.6	107.2	SR 156 west (Red Bud Road) – Calhoun, Salacoa Creek Park	Eastern terminus of SR 156
Georgia	Gordon		70.8	113.9	SR 136 (Nicklesville Road) – Resaca, Talking Rock	
Georgia	Murray	Ramhurst	78.6	126.5	US 76 east / SR 282 east	Southern end of US 76 concurrency
Georgia	Murray	Chatsworth	83.9	135.0	SR 2 east / SR 52 east / SR 52 Alt. west (Fort Street) – Dalton, Ellijay, Fort Mountain State Park, Vann House Historic Site	Southern end of SR 2 and SR 52 concurrencies; eastern terminus of SR 52 Alt.
Georgia	Murray	Chatsworth	85.3	137.3	US 76 west (G.I. Maddox Parkway) / SR 52 west – Dalton, Vann House Historic Site	Northern end of US 76 and SR 52 concurrencies
Georgia	Murray	Eton	88.1	141.8	SR 286 west	Eastern terminus of SR 286
Georgia	Murray	Cisco	97.1	156.3	SR 2 west – Ringgold	Northern end of SR 2 concurrency
Georgia	Murray	Tennga	99.9	160.8	SR 61 ends	Northern end of SR 61 concurrency; northern terminus of SR 61
			99.9 0.0	160.8 0.0	Georgia–Tennessee state line	
Tennessee	Polk	Conasauga	0.0	0.0	SR 33 begins	Southern end of unsigned SR 33 concurrency; southern terminus of unsigned SR 33
Tennessee	Polk	Oldfort	3.1	5.0	SR 313 west (Ladd Springs Road) – Cleveland	Eastern terminus of SR 313
Tennessee	Polk	Ocoee	9.8	15.8	US 64 / US 74 (Ocoee Scenic Byway / SR 40) – Cleveland, Murphy, NC	Partial cloverleaf interchange; provides access to the Cherokee National Forest
Tennessee	Polk	Benton	15.7	25.3	SR 314 south (Parksville Road) – Parksville	Northern terminus of SR 314
Tennessee	Polk	Delano	21.7	34.9	SR 30 east – Reliance	Southern end of SR 30 concurrency
Tennessee	Polk	Delano	23.6	38.0	SR 163 west (Bowater Road) – Calhoun	Eastern terminus of SR 163
Tennessee	McMinn	Etowah	29.0	46.7	SR 310 east (Mecca Pike) – Tellico Plains	Western terminus of SR 310
Tennessee	McMinn	Etowah	29.8	48.0	SR 30 west (David W. Lilliard Memorial Highway) – Athens	Northern end of SR 30 concurrency
Tennessee	McMinn	Englewood	36.1	58.1	SR 39 west (Englewood Avenue) – Athens	Southern end of SR 39 concurrency
Tennessee	McMinn	Englewood	36.2	58.3	SR 39 east (Tellico Street) – Tellico Plains	Northern end of SR 39 concurrency
Tennessee	Monroe	Madisonville	45.0	72.4	SR 68 (New Highway 68) – Madisonville, Sweetwater, Tellico Plains	Partial cloverleaf interchange; provides access to The Lost Sea and the Cherokee National Forest
Tennessee	Monroe	Madisonville			Warren Street south – Madisonville	Southbound exit, northbound entrance; northern terminus of Warren Street
Tennessee	Monroe	Vonore	52.4	84.3	SR 72 west – Loudon	Southern end of SR 72 concurrency
Tennessee	Monroe	Vonore	54.7	88.0	SR 360 south (Unicoi Turnpike) – Tellico Plains	Northern terminus of SR 360; provides access to Fort Loudoun State Park
Tennessee	Monroe	Vonore	57.4	92.4	SR 72 east – Tallassee	Northern end of SR 72 concurrency
Tennessee	Loudon		61.8	99.5	SR 95 north – Greenback	Southern terminus of SR 95
Tennessee	Blount		63.3	101.9	SR 336 east (Brick Mill Road) – Lanier	Western terminus of SR 336
Tennessee	Blount		67.7	109.0	US 129 south (Calderwood Highway / SR 115) – Fontana, NC, Robbinsville, NC	Southern end of US 129 concurrency; provides access to the Tail of the Dragon
Tennessee	Blount	Maryville	69.4	111.7	SR 335 north (William Blount Drive)	Southern terminus of SR 335
Tennessee	Blount	Maryville	72.4	116.5	US 129 north / US 411 Truck north (Alcoa Highway / SR 115) – Knoxville, Alcoa	Directional T interchange; no access from southbound US 129 to northbound US 411; northern end of US 129 concurrency; provides access to McGhee Tyson Airport
Tennessee	Blount	Maryville	73.1	117.6	US 321 (Lamar Alexander Parkway / SR 73) – Lenoir City, Friendsville, Walland, Townsend	Provides access to the Great Smoky Mountains National Park
Tennessee	Blount	Maryville	74.0	119.1	US 411 Truck south / SR 33 north (Broadway Avenue) / SR 35 south (Washington Street) – Alcoa, Knoxville	Northern end of SR 33 concurrency; southern end of US 411 Truck/SR 35 concurrency
Tennessee	Blount	Maryville			US 411 Truck north (SR 447/Washington Street) to US 321	Northern end of US 411 Truck concurrency
Tennessee	Sevier	Seymour	89.0	143.2	US 441 north (Chapman Highway / SR 71) / SR 338 north (Boyds Creek Highway) – Knoxville	Southern end of US 441 concurrency; southern terminus of SR 338
Tennessee	Sevier	Sevierville	101.8	163.8	US 441 south (Forks of the River Parkway / SR 71) / SR 66 north (Winfield Dunn Parkway) to I-40 – Pigeon Forge, Gatlinburg, Knoxville	Northern end of US 441 concurrency; southern terminus of SR 66
Tennessee	Sevier	Sevierville			SR 448 north (North Parkway)	Southern terminus of SR 448
Tennessee	Sevier	Sevierville	102.9	165.6	SR 449 south (Veterans Boulevard) – Pigeon Forge	Northern terminus of SR 449; provides access to Dollywood
Tennessee	Sevier	Sevierville	104.8	168.7	SR 416 east (Old Newport Highway) – Pittman Center	Western terminus of SR 416
Tennessee	Sevier	Sevierville	105.6	169.9	SR 339 east (Long Springs Road) – Cosby	Western terminus of SR 339
Tennessee	Jefferson	Chestnut Hill	116.0	186.7	SR 92 north (Chestnut Hill Road) – Dandridge	Southern terminus of SR 92
Tennessee	Cocke	Newport	121.4	195.4	US 25W / US 70 / SR 35 north to I-40 – Dandridge	Northern terminus of US 411; northern end of SR 35 concurrency; SR 35 continues north as an unsigned highway.
1.000 mi = 1.609 km; 1.000 km = 0.621 mi: Concurrency terminus; Incomplete access
