= Alabama State Route 283 =

State highway in Alabama, United States

State Route 283

Route information
- Maintained by ALDOT
- Length: 3.077 mi (4.952 km)

Major junctions
- West end: US 411 in Centre
- SR 68 in Centre; SR 9 in Centre
- East end: US 411 in Centre

Location
- Country: United States
- State: Alabama
- Counties: Cherokee

Highway system
- Alabama State Highway System; Interstate; US; State
← SR 281	→ SR 285

State Route 283 (SR 283) is a 3-mile-long (4.8 km) route that serves as a connection between US 411 in the central business district of Centre and US 411 on the eastern edge of the town in Cherokee County.

== Route description ==
SR 283 begins at its intersection with US 411 in the central business district of Centre. From this point, the route travels in a northeasterly direction as Cedar Bluff Road where it meets US 411 Truck and SR 68 and turns in an easterly direction. SR 283 then briefly travels to the east before turning to the southeast en route to its eastern terminus at US 411 in eastern Centre.

== Major intersections ==
The entire route is in Centre, Cherokee County.

mi	km	Destinations	Notes
0.000	0.000	US 411 (SR 25) – Piedmont, Rome GA, Gadsden, Leesburg	Southern terminus
0.718	1.156	US 411 Truck south / SR 68 – Rome, Cedar Bluff, Gadsden	West end of US 411 Truck overlap
0.867	1.395	SR 9 – Piedmont, Cedar Bluff	
3.077	4.952	US 411 (SR 25) / US 411 Truck south – Rome, Atlanta	Northern terminus; East end of US 411 Truck overlap
1.000 mi = 1.609 km; 1.000 km = 0.621 mi
