= Alabama State Route 68 =

Highway in Alabama

State Route 68

Route information
- Maintained by ALDOT
- Length: 52.926 mi (85.176 km)

Major junctions
- West end: SR 75 near Albertville
- I-59 in Collinsville; US 11 in Collinsville; US 411 in Leesburg
- East end: SR 114 at the Georgia state line near Gaylesville

Location
- Country: United States
- State: Alabama
- Counties: Marshall, DeKalb, Cherokee

Highway system
- Alabama State Highway System; Interstate; US; State
← SR 67	→ SR 69

State Route 68 (SR 68) is a 52.926-mile-long (85.176 km) state highway in the northeastern part of the U.S. state of Alabama. The western terminus of the highway is at an intersection with SR 75 slightly northeast of Albertville. The highway continues until it reaches the Georgia state line becoming Georgia State Route 114 (SR 114).

== Route description ==
SR 68 begins at the foothills of the Appalachian Mountains northeast of Albertville. There are numerous curves along the highway as it travels through DeKalb County. The highway maintains a generally eastward trajectory between Albertville and Collinsville. East of an intersection with U.S. Route 11 (US 11), the highway turns to the southeast, continuing on this orientation until it approaches Leesburg.

At Leesburg, SR 68 and US 411 intersect and begin a 5 miles (8.0 km) concurrency as they cross Weiss Lake and Weiss Dam and approach Centre. SR 68 diverts from US 411 and begins a concurrency with SR 9 as the two highways again cross the lake, diverting from each other at Cedar Bluff. From there, SR 68 travels to the northeast as it approaches the Georgia state line.

== Major intersections ==
County	Location	mi	km	Destinations	Notes
Marshall		0.000	0.000	SR 75 – Albertville, Geraldine	Western terminus
DeKalb	Kilpatrick	4.810	7.741	SR 168 west – Boaz	Eastern terminus of SR 168
DeKalb	Crossville	9.850	15.852	SR 227 south	Western end of SR 227 concurrency
DeKalb	Crossville	10.079	16.221	SR 227 north – Geraldine	Eastern end of SR 227 concurrency
DeKalb	Collinsville	18.767	30.203	I-59 – Chattanooga, Gadsden	I-59 exit 205
DeKalb	Collinsville	20.001	32.188	US 11 north (SR 7 north) – Fort Payne	Western end of US 11/SR 7 concurrency
DeKalb	Collinsville	20.569	33.103	US 11 south (SR 7 south) – Attalla	Eastern end of US 11/SR 7 concurrency
DeKalb		24.094	38.776	SR 176 east / CR 3 south – Little River Canyon	Western terminus of SR 176; provides access to Little River Canyon Rim Parkway
Cherokee	Leesburg	29.269	47.104	SR 273 north – Blanche, Little River Canyon Mouth Park, Little River Canyon	Southern terminus of SR 273
Cherokee	Leesburg	30.319	48.794	US 411 south (SR 25 south) – Gadsden	Western end of US 411/SR 25 concurrency
Cherokee	Centre	33.640	54.138	US 411 north (SR 25 north) – Centre	Eastern end of US 411/SR 25 concurrency; southern terminus of US 411 Truck; western end of US 411 Truck conurrency
Cherokee	Centre	35.854	57.701	US 411 Truck north / SR 283	Eastern end of US 411 Truck concurrency
Cherokee	Centre	36.071	58.051	SR 9 south – Piedmont	Western end of SR 9 concurrency
Cherokee	Cedar Bluff	41.301	66.468	SR 9 north – Rome, GA	Eastern end of SR 9 concurrency
Cherokee	Gaylesville	46.040	74.094	SR 35 – Fort Payne, Rome, GA, Little River Canyon	
Cherokee		52.926	85.176	SR 114 east – Summerville	Georgia state line; eastern terminus
1.000 mi = 1.609 km; 1.000 km = 0.621 mi: Concurrency terminus
