= CV22 =

CV-22, CV22 or CV 22 may refer to:

- Bell Boeing V-22 Osprey, a tiltrotor aircraft; its CV-22 version is operated by the United States Air Force
- USS Independence (CV-22), an aircraft carrier operated by the U.S. Navy from 1942 to 1946, after which it was sunk in 1951 following nuclear testing at Bikini Atoll
- CV22 Coventry postcode area for Rugby, Warwickshire, England

== See also ==
- CVL-22 (disambiguation)
- C22 (disambiguation)
- V22 (disambiguation)
