= Pine Ridge, Alabama =

- Town
- Location of Pine Ridge in DeKalb County, Alabama.
- Coordinates: 34°26′45″N 85°46′45″W
- Country: United States
- State: Alabama
- County: DeKalb

Area
  - Total: 1.33 sq mi (3.45 km^{2})
  - Land: 1.33 sq mi (3.45 km^{2})
  - Water: 0 sq mi (0.00 km^{2})
- Elevation: 955 ft (291 m)

Population (2020)
  - Total: 263
  - Density: 197.5/sq mi (76.24/km^{2})
- Time zone: UTC-6 (Central (CST))
  - Summer (DST): UTC-5 (CDT)
- ZIP code: 35968
- Area codes: 256 and 938
- FIPS code: 01-60372
- GNIS feature ID: 2407119

Pine Ridge is a town in DeKalb County, Alabama, United States. It incorporated in 1982. At the 2020 census, the population was 263.

== Geography ==
Pine Ridge is located near the geographic center of DeKalb County at 34°26′45″N 85°46′45″W (34.445939, -85.779069). It is bordered to the east by the city of Fort Payne, the county seat, and to the northwest by the city of Rainsville.

Pine Ridge is in the Ridge and Valley portion of the Appalachian Mountains and occupies a series of low ridges and valleys. From east to west, they are Middle Ridge, Dugout Valley, Shinbone Ridge, and Sand Valley, with the northwestern part of the town climbing the eastern edge of Sand Mountain, a southern extension of the Cumberland Plateau.

Alabama State Route 35 passes through the town, connecting Fort Payne and Rainsville. Exit 218 on Interstate 59 is 2 miles (3 km) east of Pine Ridge via AL 35.

According to the U.S. Census Bureau, the town has a total area of 1.3 square miles (3.4 km^{2}), all land.

== Demographics ==
Historical population
Census	Pop.	Note	%±
1990	227		—
2000	243		7.0%
2010	282		16.0%
2020	263		−6.7%
U.S. Decennial Census; 2013 Estimate

As of the 2010 Census Pine Ridge had a population of 282. There were 104 households. The racial composition of the population was 76.2% non-Hispanic white, 1.8% black or African American, 0.4% Pacific Islander, 1.4% from two or more races and 20.9% Hispanic or Latino.

As of the census of 2000, there were 243 people, 100 households, and 70 families residing in the town. The population density was 192.2 inhabitants per square mile (74.2/km^{2}). There were 112 housing units at an average density of 88.6 per square mile (34.2/km^{2}). The racial makeup of the town was 96.30% White, and 3.70% from two or more races. 0.41% of the population were Hispanic or Latino of any race.

There were 100 households, out of which 33.0% had children under the age of 18 living with them, 58.0% were married couples living together, 7.0% had a female householder with no husband present, and 30.0% were non-families. 29.0% of all households were made up of individuals, and 12.0% had someone living alone who was 65 years of age or older. The average household size was 2.43 and the average family size was 3.01.

In the town, the population was spread out, with 24.3% under the age of 18, 11.1% from 18 to 24, 30.5% from 25 to 44, 22.2% from 45 to 64, and 11.9% who were 65 years of age or older. The median age was 37 years. For every 100 females, there were 89.8 males. For every 100 females age 18 and over, there were 89.7 males.

The median income for a household in the town was $28,250, and the median income for a family was $30,833. Males had a median income of $22,404 versus $13,250 for females. The per capita income for the town was $14,237. About 15.3% of families and 14.9% of the population were below the poverty line, including 16.4% of those under the age of eighteen and 20.0% of those 65 or over.
