= Forney, Alabama =

- Unincorporated community
- Location within Alabama Location within the United States
- Coordinates: 34°05′10″N 85°27′43″W
- Country: United States
- State: Alabama
- County: Cherokee
- Elevation: 702 ft (214 m)
- Time zone: UTC-6 (Central (CST))
  - Summer (DST): UTC-5 (CDT)
- Area codes: 256 & 938
- GNIS feature ID: 118508

Forney is an unincorporated community in Cherokee County, Alabama, United States. Forney is located on U.S. Route 411, 13.2 miles (21.2 km) east-southeast of Centre.

== History ==
A post office called Forney was established in 1878, and remained in operation until 1936. The community was named for P. Forney, who kept a store there.
