= Leesburg, Alabama =

- Town
- Logo

- Location of Leesburg in Cherokee County, Alabama.
- Coordinates: 34°11′25″N 85°45′38″W
- Country: United States
- State: Alabama
- County: Cherokee

Area
  - Total: 6.28 sq mi (16.27 km^{2})
  - Land: 6.27 sq mi (16.24 km^{2})
  - Water: 0.012 sq mi (0.03 km^{2})
- Elevation: 600 ft (180 m)

Population (2020)
  - Total: 911
  - Density: 145/sq mi (56.1/km^{2})
- Time zone: UTC-6 (Central (CST))
  - Summer (DST): UTC-5 (CDT)
- ZIP code: 35983
- Area code: 256
- FIPS code: 01-42016
- GNIS feature ID: 2405999
- Website: www.leesburgal.com

Leesburg is a town in Cherokee County, Alabama, United States. At the 2020 census, the population was 911.

== History ==
Leesburg was originally called Hamptonville; it was named for Joseph Hampton and the Henslee family respectively. A post office was established as Hamptonville in 1836, and in 1839 the name was changed to Leesburg.

== Geography ==
Leesburg is located in western Cherokee County. It is bordered by Lookout Mountain and the town of Sand Rock to the north and Weiss Lake on the Coosa River to the south. Weiss Dam, forming the lake, is located just south of the town limits.

U.S. Route 411 runs through the town from west to east, leading southeast 5 mi (8 km) to Centre, the county seat of Cherokee County, and southwest 19 mi (31 km) to Gadsden. Alabama State Route 68 meets US-411 in town, leading north 5 mi (8 km) to Sand Rock, and following US-411 east to Centre.

According to the U.S. Census Bureau, Leesburg has a total area of 6.4 square miles (16.7 km^{2}), of which 0.019 square miles (0.05 km^{2}), or 0.29%, is water.

=== Climate ===
Climate is characterized by relatively high temperatures and evenly distributed precipitation throughout the year. The Köppen Climate Classification subtype for this climate is "Cfa" (Humid Subtropical Climate).

== Demographics ==
Historical population
| Census | Pop. | Note | %± |
|---|---|---|---|
| 1970 | 98 | | — |
| 1980 | 116 | | 18.4% |
| 1990 | 218 | | 87.9% |
| 2000 | 799 | | 266.5% |
| 2010 | 1,027 | | 28.5% |
| 2020 | 911 | | −11.3% |
U.S. Decennial Census; 2013 Estimate

=== 2020 census ===
Leesburg racial composition
| Race | Num. | Perc. |
|---|---|---|
| White (non-Hispanic) | 837 | 91.88% |
| Black or African American (non-Hispanic) | 11 | 1.21% |
| Native American | 9 | 0.99% |
| Asian | 2 | 0.22% |
| Other/Mixed | 42 | 4.61% |
| Hispanic or Latino | 10 | 1.1% |

As of the 2020 United States census, there were 911 people, 381 households, and 292 families residing in the town.

=== 2010 census ===
As of the census of 2010, there were 1,027 people, 409 households, and 298 families residing in the town. The population density was 160 inhabitants per square mile (62/km^{2}). There were 663 housing units at an average density of 103.6 per square mile (40.0/km^{2}). The racial makeup of the town was 96.5% White, 0.0% Native American, 0.0% Asian, 0.5% from other races, and 1.9% from two or more races. 1.3% of the population were Hispanic or Latino of any race.

There were 409 households, out of which 29.1% had children under the age of 18 living with them, 55.3% were married couples living together, 11.0% had a female householder with no husband present, and 27.1% were non-families. 22.0% of all households were made up of individuals, and 9.3% had someone living alone who was 65 years of age or older. The average household size was 2.51 and the average family size was 2.90.

In the town, the population was spread out, with 23.5% under the age of 18, 8.9% from 18 to 24, 25.1% from 25 to 44, 29.4% from 45 to 64, and 13.1% who were 65 years of age or older. The median age was 40.4 years. For every 100 females, there were 103.4 males. For every 100 females age 18 and over, there were 102.8 males.

The median income for a household in the town was $36,806, and the median income for a family was $45,714. Males had a median income of $32,075 versus $26,793 for females. The per capita income for the town was $18,392. About 12.5% of families and 15.6% of the population were below the poverty line, including 18.2% of those under age 18 and 12.2% of those age 65 or over.

== Government ==
The town of Leesburg operates a Mayor–council government, composed of Mayor Brandy Pierce and 5 town council members. Place #1 is held by Councilwoman Lisa Burt, Place #2 is held by Councilman Joe Sonaty, Place #3 is held by Councilman Jimmy Tillery, Place #4 is held by Councilman Keith Hayes, and Place #5 is held by Councilwoman Melissa Rodriguez.

== Notable people ==
- Tommie Bass, herbalist
- Lindy Hood, college basketball All-American center for Alabama
