= Cherokee County Airport =

Cherokee County Airport may refer to:

- Cherokee County Regional Airport in Cherokee County, Georgia, United States (FAA: CNI, formerly 47A)
- Cherokee County Airport (Texas) in Cherokee County, Texas, United States (FAA: JSO)
- Centre–Piedmont–Cherokee County Regional Airport in Alabama (FAA: PYP)
- Western Carolina Regional Airport, owned by Cherokee county in North Carolina (FAA: RHP)
