= Alabama State Route 9 =

Highway in Alabama

State Route 9

Route information
- Maintained by ALDOT
- Length: 273.069 mi (439.462 km) First 123.483 mi (198.727 km) are unsigned

Standalone section
- Length: 149.586 mi (240.735 km)
- South end: US 231 / SR 21 in Wetumpka
- Major intersections: US 280 near Kellyton; US 431 in Hollis Crossroads; I-20 in Heflin; US 78 near Heflin; US 278 in Piedmont; US 411 in Centre
- North end: SR 20 near Cedar Bluff

Location
- Country: United States
- State: Alabama
- Counties: Covington, Crenshaw, Montgomery, Elmore, Coosa, Clay, Cleburne, Calhoun, Cherokee

Highway system
- Alabama State Highway System; Interstate; US; State
← SR 8	→ I-10

State Route 9 (SR 9) is one of the longest state highways in the U.S. state of Alabama, spanning 149.59 miles (240.74 km). From the Florida state line north to Montgomery, SR 9 is the unsigned partner route of U.S. Route 331 (US 331). As a signed route, the southern terminus of SR 9 is at its junction with US 231 and SR 21 at Wetumpka, and the northern terminus of the route is at the Georgia state line east of Cedar Bluff, where the route becomes State Route 20 (SR 20).

== Route description ==
US 331 enters Alabama from Florida near the border town of Florala. The route is one of several routes used to connect Alabama and other northern settlements with the Gulf of Mexico beaches in northwest Florida. From the state line to Montgomery, US 331 and SR 9 follow a north–south orientation. North of Montgomery, SR 9 as a standalone route assumes a more northeast–southwest orientation, and passes through rural areas and small towns in the eastern part of the state.

== Major intersections ==
County	Location	mi	km	Destinations	Notes
see US 331 (mile 0.000-100.388)
Montgomery	Montgomery	100.474	161.697	US 80 west / US 82 west / SR 21 south (South Boulevard / SR 6 west / SR 8 west) to I-65 / I-85 – Selma, Tuscaloosa, Airport	North end of US 331 concurrency; south end of US 80/US 82/SR 6/SR 8/SR 21 concurrency; northern terminus of US 331
Montgomery	Montgomery	104.371	167.969	US 82 east / US 231 south (Troy Highway / SR 6 east / SR 53 south) – Union Springs, Troy, Ozark, Dothan, H. Councill Trenholm State Technical College	North end of US 82/SR 6 concurrency; south end of US 231/SR 53 concurrency
see SR 21 (mile 141.419-164.428)
Elmore	Wetumpka	123.483	198.727	US 231 north / SR 21 north (SR 53) – Rockford, Sylacauga	North end of US 231/SR 21/SR 53 concurrency; south end of signed SR 9
Coosa	Equality	140.318	225.820	SR 259 north	Southern terminus of SR 259
Coosa		147.705	237.708	SR 22 west – Rockford	South end of SR 22 concurrency
Coosa		147.748	237.777	SR 22 east – Alexander City	North end of SR 22 concurrency
Coosa		152.902	246.072	SR 115 north – Kellyton	Southern terminus of SR 115
Coosa		156.595	252.015	US 280 (SR 38) – Sylacauga, Alexander City	Interchange
Clay	Cleveland Crossroads	167.115	268.946	SR 63 south – Hackneyville	Northern terminus of SR 63
Clay	Millerville	173.899	279.863	SR 148 west – Sylacauga	Eastern terminus of SR 148
Clay	Ashland	182.092	293.049	SR 77 north	South end of SR 77 concurrency
Clay	Ashland	182.148	293.139	SR 77 south / CR 31 north	North end of SR 77 concurrency
Clay	Lineville	187.925	302.436	SR 49 – Cheaha State Park	
Clay	Lineville	188.587	303.501	SR 48 east – Wedowee	Western terminus of SR 48
Cleburne	Hollis Crossroads	205.787	331.182	US 431 (SR 1) – Oxford, Wedowee	
Cleburne	Heflin	213.592	343.743	I-20 – Birmingham, Atlanta	I-20 exit 199
Cleburne	Heflin	215.052	346.093	US 78 east (SR 4)	South end of US 78/SR 4 concurrency
Cleburne		217.661	350.291	SR 281 south	Northern terminus of SR 281
Calhoun		219.319	352.960	US 78 west (SR 4) – Oxford, Heflin	North end of US 78/SR 4 concurrency
Calhoun	Piedmont	241.365	388.439	US 278 west (SR 74) – Gadsden, Anniston	South end of US 278/SR 74 concurrency
Calhoun	Piedmont	241.453	388.581	US 278 east (SR 74) – Cedartown, Atlanta	North end of US 278/SR 74 concurrency
Cherokee	Centre	257.656	414.657	US 411 (SR 25) – Gadsden, Rome	
Cherokee	Centre	258.385	415.830	US 411 Truck / SR 283	
Cherokee	Centre	258.538	416.077	SR 68 west	South end of SR 68 concurrency
Cherokee	Cedar Bluff	263.767	424.492	SR 68 east	North end of SR 68 concurrency
Cherokee	Lawrence	268.181	431.595	SR 35 north – Fort Payne, Gaylesville	Southern terminus of SR 35
Cherokee		273.069	439.462	SR 20 east – Rome	Georgia state line; northern terminus
1.000 mi = 1.609 km; 1.000 km = 0.621 mi: Concurrency terminus
