= Cornwall Furnace (Cedar Bluff, Alabama) =

Historic foundry in Alabama, United States

- U.S. National Register of Historic Places
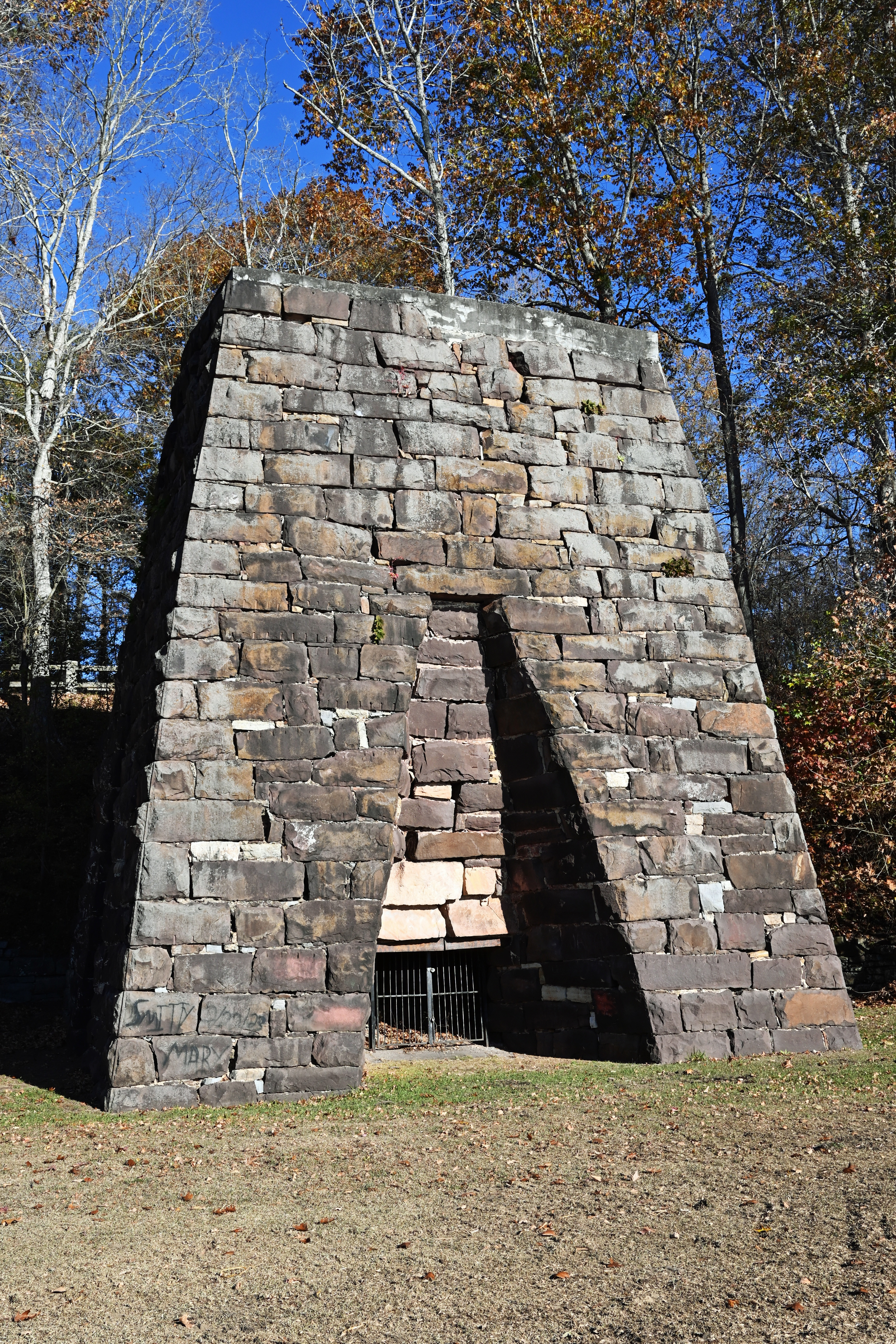
- Cornwall Furnace

- Location within Alabama Location within the United States
- Location: 2 miles (3.2 km) N of Cedar Bluff
- Nearest city: Cedar Bluff, Alabama
- Coordinates: 34°14′49″N 85°35′19″W
- Built: 1863
- Architect: Noble Brothers
- NRHP reference No.: 72000158
- Added to NRHP: September 27, 1972

Cornwall Furnace is located near Cedar Bluff, Alabama, United States, in Cherokee County. It was built by the Noble Brothers to supply iron products to the Confederate States of America during the American Civil War.

== Site ==
The furnace is roughly pyramidal in shape, 30 feet (9.1 m) square at the base, 15 feet (4.6 m) square at the top, and 45 feet (14 m) tall. It is built of large hematite blocks quarried from Dirt Cellar Mountain and brought the three miles (4.8 km) to the site by ox cart. A half-mile (0.8 km) long mill race was constructed from the Chattooga River through a tunnel under a hill to power a water wheel which provided the air blast to operate the furnace. A bridge, no longer extant, spanned from the hillside to the top of the stack, where iron ore was loaded into the furnace. A gristmill and sawmill were also located on the site.

== History ==
James Noble, Sr., and his five sons began operating the Noble Brothers foundry in Rome, Georgia, in 1855. In 1862 the Confederate States of America commissioned the company to build two new furnaces, in exchange for cannons, caissons, and other products. Construction of the furnace began shortly thereafter, involving an estimated 1,000 Confederate soldiers and slaves from nearby plantations.

The furnace went into production in either late 1862 or early 1863. Charcoal was produced on nearby farms and plantations to fire the furnace, and water power from the Chattooga River was used to power the blast. The pig iron ingots manufactured at the furnace were sent to the Noble Brothers' foundry in Rome for the manufacture of war materials. The furnace was knocked out of production for the remainder of the war by Union troops under William T. Sherman in 1864.

It was put back into operation after the war in 1867, but was ceased operation permanently in 1874. Evangelist Samuel Porter Jones worked at the furnace some time after the Civil War operating an ox cart. The property changed hands several times over the next 100 years.

== Preservation ==
Cornwall Furnace was listed on the National Register of Historic Places in 1972. In 1975 the furnace and surrounding 5 acres (2.0 hectares) were acquired by the Cherokee County Commission with the aid of the Alabama Historical Commission and the Cherokee County Historical Society. The commission developed the site into a park, which was inaugurated in 1977. It is part of the Civil War Discovery Trail.
