= Hollis Crossroads, Alabama =

- Census-designated place
- Location of Hollis Crossroads in Cleburne County, Alabama.
- Coordinates: 33°30′40″N 85°38′14″W
- Country: United States
- State: Alabama
- County: Cleburne

Area
  - Total: 12.47 sq mi (32.29 km^{2})
  - Land: 12.46 sq mi (32.26 km^{2})
  - Water: 0.012 sq mi (0.03 km^{2})
- Elevation: 850 ft (260 m)

Population (2020)
  - Total: 665
  - Density: 53.4/sq mi (20.61/km^{2})
- Time zone: UTC-6 (Central (CST))
  - Summer (DST): UTC-5 (CDT)
- Area codes: 256 & 938
- GNIS feature ID: 2582682

Hollis Crossroads is a census-designated place and unincorporated community in Cleburne County, Alabama, United States. Its population was 665 as of the 2020 census. Hollis Crossroads is located along U.S. Route 431 between Anniston and Wedowee and Alabama State Route 9 between Lineville to Heflin; Routes 431 and 9 intersect here. The Pleasant Grove Elementary School is located here.

== Demographics ==
Historical population
Census	Pop.	Note	%±
2010	608		—
2020	665		9.4%
U.S. Decennial Census

Hollis Crossroads was listed as a census designated place in the 2010 U.S. census.

Hollis Crossroads CDP, Alabama – Racial and ethnic composition Note: the US Census treats Hispanic/Latino as an ethnic category. This table excludes Latinos from the racial categories and assigns them to a separate category. Hispanics/Latinos may be of any race.
Race / Ethnicity (NH = Non-Hispanic)	Pop 2010	Pop 2020	% 2010	% 2020
White alone (NH)	511	540	84.05%	81.20%
Black or African American alone (NH)	33	46	5.43%	6.92%
Native American or Alaska Native alone (NH)	2	1	0.33%	0.15%
Asian alone (NH)	0	1	0.00%	0.15%
Native Hawaiian or Pacific Islander alone (NH)	0	0	0.00%	0.00%
Other race alone (NH)	0	0	0.00%	0.00%
Mixed race or Multiracial (NH)	11	29	1.81%	4.36%
Hispanic or Latino (any race)	51	48	8.39%	7.22%
Total	608	665	100.00%	100.00%
