= John L. Burnett =

American politician (1854–1919)

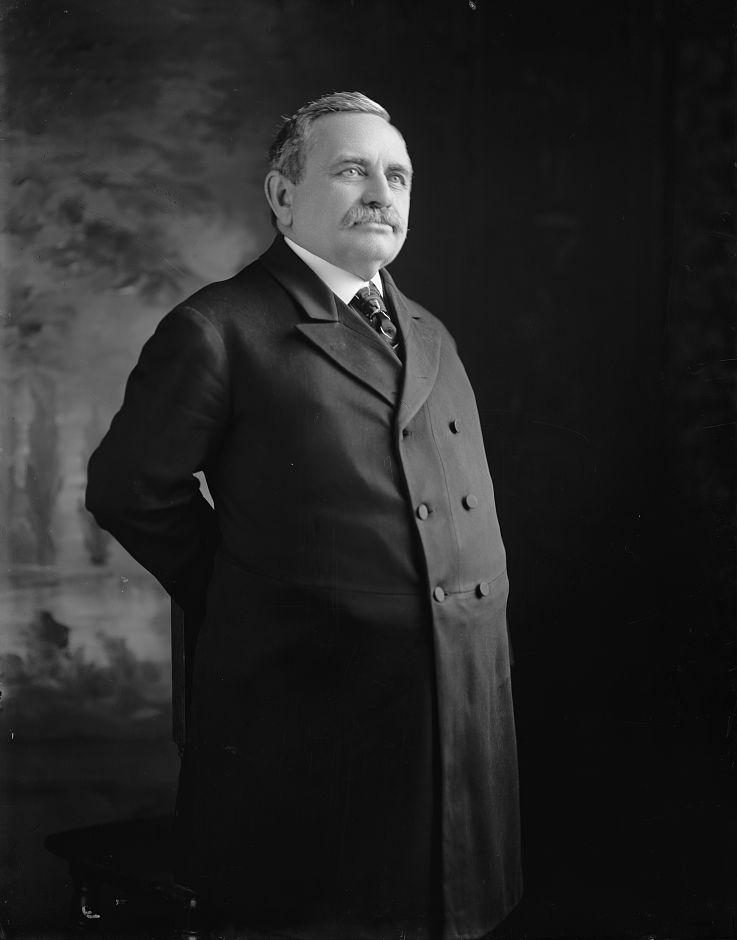

Member of the U.S. House of Representatives from Alabama's 7th district
- In office March 4, 1899 – May 13, 1919
- Preceded by: Milford W. Howard
- Succeeded by: Lilius B. Rainey

Personal details
- Born: John Lawson Burnett; January 20, 1854 Cedar Bluff, Alabama
- Died: May 13, 1919 (aged 65) Gadsden, Alabama
- Resting place: Forest Cemetery

John Lawson Burnett (January 20, 1854 – May 13, 1919) was an American lawyer and politician who served eleven terms as a U.S. representative from Alabama 1899 to 1919.

== Life ==
Born in Cedar Bluff, Alabama, Burnett attended the common schools of the county, Wesleyan Institute, Cave Spring, Georgia, and the local high school at Gaylesville, Alabama.

=== Studies and early politics ===
He studied law and graduated from Vanderbilt University, Nashville, Tennessee.

In 1876, he was admitted to the bar in Cherokee County, Alabama and commenced practice in Gadsden thereafter. He served in the State House of Representatives in 1884 and as member of the State senate in 1886.

== Congress ==
Burnett was elected as a Democrat to the Fifty-sixth and to the ten succeeding Congresses and served from March 4, 1899, until his death.

He served as chairman of the Committee on Immigration and Naturalization (Sixty-second through Sixty-fifth Congresses). On April 5, 1917, John Lawson Burnett was one of the 50 representatives who voted against declaring war on Germany (World War I).

He served as member of the United States Immigration Commission 1907-1910. In 1907, Congressman John L. Burnett called Syrians "the most undesirable of the undesirable peoples of Asia Minor".

== Death and burial ==
John L. Burnett died in Gadsden, Alabama on May 13, 1919, and was interred in Forest Cemetery.

== See also ==
- List of members of the United States Congress who died in office (1900–1949)

U.S. House of Representatives
| Preceded by Milford W. Howard | Member of the U.S. House of Representatives from Alabama's 7th congressional district March 4, 1899 – May 13, 1919 | Succeeded by Lilius Bratton Rainey |
