= PYP =

PYP may refer to:

- Portland Youth Philharmonic, a youth orchestra in Portland, Oregon
- IB Primary Years Programme, a program developed by the International Baccalaureate for students between kindergarten and 5th grade in the United States
- Centre–Piedmont–Cherokee County Regional Airport (FAA LID: PYP), an airport near Centre, Alabama
- Pohjoismaiden Yhdyspankki (abbreviated as PYP), a former bank in Finland
