= Alabama State Route 98 =

There is no current State Route 98 in the U.S. state of Alabama.

- See U.S. Route 98 in Alabama for the current route numbered 98
- See Alabama State Route 98 (pre-1957) for the former SR 98
