= Cherokee County Herald =

American weekly newspaper in Alabama

Cherokee County Post-Herald
- Type: Weekly newspaper
- Owner: David Crawford Jr.
- Publisher: David Crawford Jr.
- Editor: Scott Wright
- Founded: 1938
- Headquarters: Centre, Alabama, United States
- Circulation: 1,500
- Website: cherokeeherald.com

The Cherokee County Post-Herald is a weekly newspaper in Centre, Alabama.

== Ownership ==
The Herald was founded by Joseph M. Shaw Sr. in 1938. He was a veteran and an active member in his community, participating in the Lion's Club, Centre Chamber of Commerce, and First Baptist Church. Joseph "Joe" Shaw Jr., who was 17 when the paper first started, became assistant publisher of the Herald. He left his position at the paper for four years while he was in the Army and returned in 1946 as associate editor and publisher, Joseph jr. took ownership of the Herald after his father's death in 1965.

The Herald was the only weekly newspaper in Cherokee County until 1984, when Consolidated Publishing Co. started the Cherokee Sun as a weekly shopper. The Sun was later sold to the Cherokee Publishing Co.. The shopper merged with the Cherokee County Herald and was provided to every household in the county not subscribed to the Herald.

Melrose Shaw briefly became publisher after her husband's death, then retired from the newspaper business and sold the Herald to News Publishing Co. David Crawford Jr., owner of the Cherokee County Post, bought the Herald from the News Publishing Company in 2017, restoring local ownership to the paper. In 2017, staff member Shannon Fagan won the Baker-Dean Media Award from Cherokee County Museum and Historical Society.

In March 2020, Crawford combined The Post (a weekly shopper) and The Herald (the county's paper of record) into the Cherokee Post-Herald. Scott Wright, the editor of The Post since 2000, became the managing editor of the new weekly paper. Weekly circulation is 1,500 copies.
