= C22 =

C22 or C-22 or C.22 may refer to:

- Aérospatiale C.22, a French target drone
- Boeing C-22, a military version of the Boeing 727-100/200
- C-22 process, a photographic process
- Caldwell 22 (NGC 7662, the Blue Snowball Nebula), a planetary nebula in the constellation Andromeda
- Canadian Armed Forces version of SIG Sauer P320 pistol
- Canadian Football Act – Unpassed 1974 Canadian federal bill
- Carbon-22 (C-22 or ^{22}C), an isotope of carbon
- Centre Municipal Airport FAA LID
- Malignant neoplasms of liver and intrahepatic bile ducts ICD-10 code
- Corydoras cochui, the barredtail corydoras, a freshwater catfish
- HMS C22, a 1909 British C-class submarine
- Sauber C22, a 2003 racing car
- Lawful Access Act – Proposed Canadian legislation
