= Centre Municipal Airport =

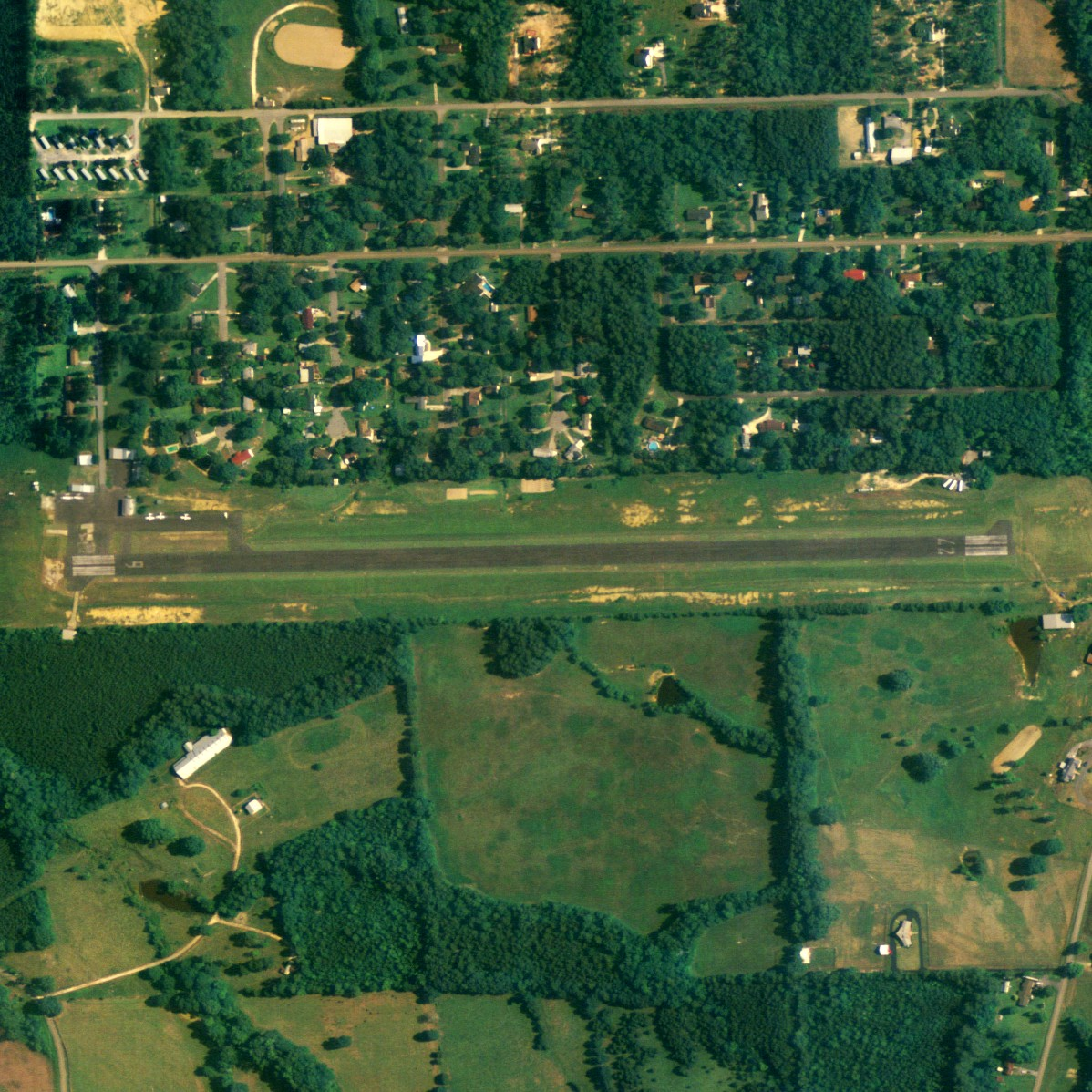
- NAIP aerial image, 15 June 2006
- IATA: none; ICAO: KPYP; FAA LID: C22

Summary
- Airport type: Public
- Owner: City of Centre
- Serves: Centre, Alabama
- Elevation AMSL: 619 ft (189 m)
- Coordinates: 34°09′36″N 085°38′06″W
- Interactive map of Centre Municipal Airport

Runways
Direction	Length		Surface
Direction	ft	m	Surface
9/27	3,401	1,037	Asphalt

Statistics (2010)
- Aircraft operations: 4,325
- Based aircraft: 8
- Source: Federal Aviation Administration

Centre Municipal Airport (FAA LID: C22) is a city-owned, public-use airport located three nautical miles (4 mi, 6 km) east of the central business district of Centre, a city in Cherokee County, Alabama, United States. It is owned by the City of Centre.

This airport is included in the FAA's National Plan of Integrated Airport Systems for 2011–2015 and 2009–2013, both of which categorized it as a general aviation facility.

This airport has been closed.

== Facilities and aircraft ==
Centre Municipal Airport covers an area of 43 acres (17 ha) at an elevation of 619 feet (189 m) above mean sea level. It has one runway designated 9/27 with an asphalt surface measuring 3,401 by 80 feet (1,037 x 24 m).

For the 12-month period ending April 28, 2010, the airport had 4,325 aircraft operations, an average of 11 per day: 81.5% general aviation and 18.5% military. At that time there were 8 aircraft based at this airport, all single-engine.

== See also ==
- Centre-Piedmont-Cherokee County Regional Airport (34°05′24″N 085°36′36″W)
- List of airports in Alabama
