= CVL-22 =

CVL-22 may refer to the hull numbers of one of the following naval vessels:

- USS Independence (CVL-22), a light aircraft carrier in service with the United States Navy from 1943 to 1946, after which she was sunk for weapons testing
- HMCS Bonaventure (CVL 22), a light aircraft carrier in service with the Royal Canadian Navy from 1957 to 1970, after which she was sold for scrap

== See also ==
- CV-22 (disambiguation)
