= Conasauga, Polk County, Tennessee =

Conasauga, Tennessee
- CDP
- Location within Tennessee Location within the United States
- Coordinates: 35°00′16″N 84°43′46″W
- Country: United States
- State: Tennessee
- County: Polk
- Elevation: 830 ft (250 m)
- Time zone: UTC-5 (Eastern (EST))
  - Summer (DST): UTC-4 (EDT)
- ZIP code: 37316
- Area code: 423
- GNIS feature ID: 1306059

Conasauga is a CDP (Census-designated place) in southern Polk County, Tennessee, United States. It is located approximately 1.2 miles north of the Tennessee-Georgia state line and roughly 17 miles southeast of Cleveland. The Conasauga River Lumber Company was located at Conasauga.

Conasauga has its own zip code, 37616, but does not have a post office.

== History ==
Tornadoes struck the community during the 1932 Deep South tornado outbreak and again on March 21, 1974, damaging the local school, which then closed. Tragedy occurred in Conasauga on March 28, 2000, when a Murray County, Georgia school bus crossed a railroad track north of Tennga, Georgia and was struck by a train, causing fatalities.

== Demographics ==
Historical population
Year	Pop.	±%
2020	95	—
