= V22 =

V22 or similar may refer to:

- Bell Boeing V-22 Osprey, an American multi-mission, tiltrotor military aircraft
- Fokker V 22, a variant of the Fokker D.VII German World War I fighter aircraft
- V.22, an ITU-T V-series recommended protocol for interfaces and voiceband modems
- V22, an ICD-9 supplementary classification code for normal pregnancy
