= Gaylesville, Alabama =

- Town
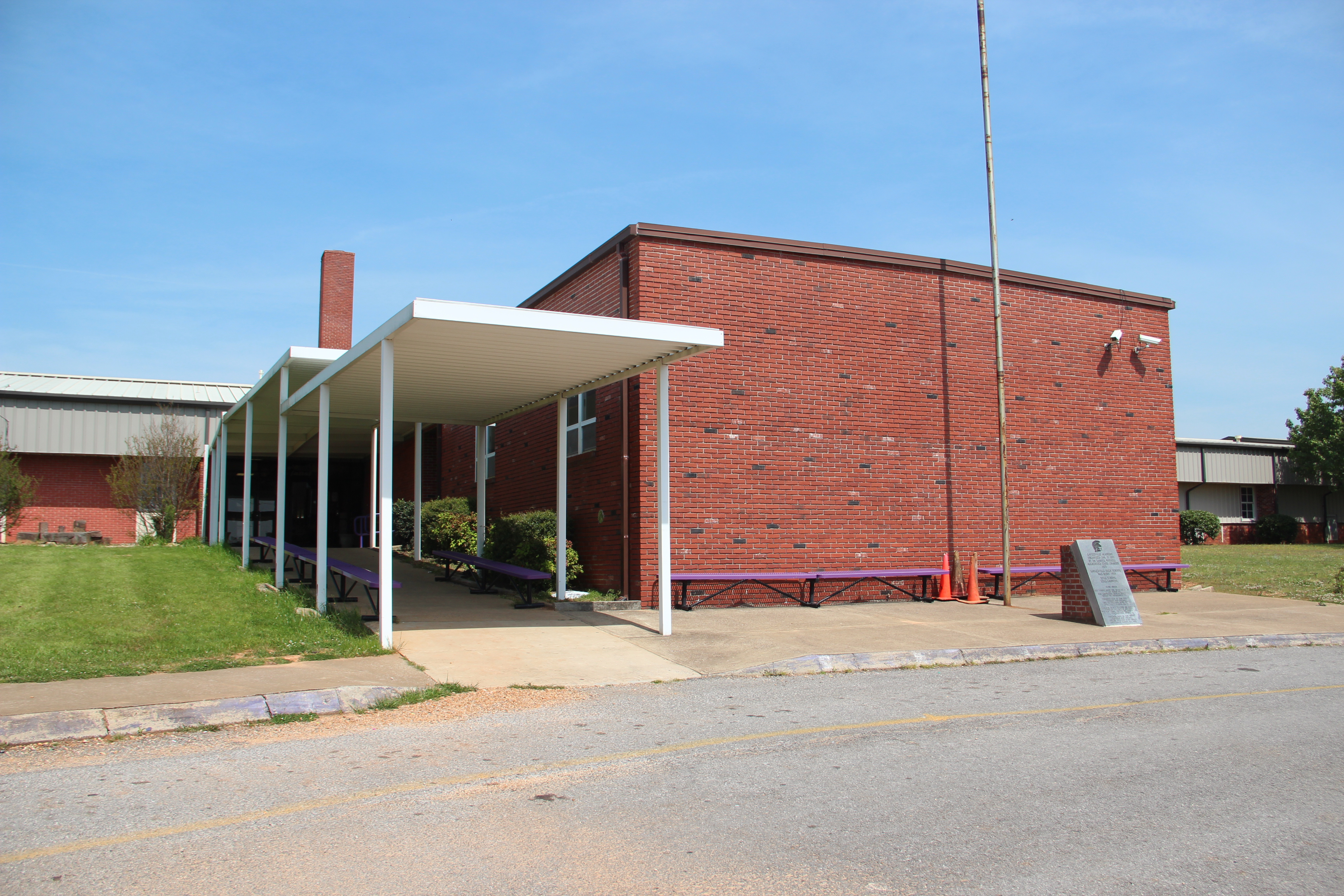
- Gaylesville School

- Location of Gaylesville in Cherokee County, Alabama.
- Coordinates: 34°16′00″N 85°33′37″W
- Country: United States
- State: Alabama
- County: Cherokee

Area
  - Total: 1.42 sq mi (3.69 km^{2})
  - Land: 1.39 sq mi (3.59 km^{2})
  - Water: 0.035 sq mi (0.09 km^{2})
- Elevation: 594 ft (181 m)

Population (2020)
  - Total: 170
  - Density: 122.5/sq mi (47.31/km^{2})
- Time zone: UTC-6 (Central (CST))
  - Summer (DST): UTC-5 (CDT)
- ZIP code: 35973
- Area code: 256
- FIPS code: 01-29296
- GNIS feature ID: 2406555

Gaylesville is a town in Cherokee County, Alabama, United States. As of the 2020 census, Gaylesville had a population of 170.

== History ==
Gaylesville is named for George W. Gayle, an Alabama politician. However, Gayle may also be the name of a local Cherokee Indian. A post office has been in operation in Gaylesville since 1836.

== Geography ==
Gaylesville is located in northeast Cherokee County on the north side of the Chattooga River where it enters Weiss Lake.

According to the U.S. Census Bureau, the town has a total area of 0.35 square miles (0.9 km^{2}), all land.

== Demographics ==
Historical population
Census	Pop.	Note	%±
1880	183		—
1900	266		—
1910	204		−23.3%
1920	226		10.8%
1930	204		−9.7%
1940	183		−10.3%
1950	194		6.0%
1960	144		−25.8%
1970	161		11.8%
1980	192		19.3%
1990	149		−22.4%
2000	140		−6.0%
2010	144		2.9%
2020	170		18.1%
U.S. Decennial Census; 2013 Estimate

As of the census of 2000, there were 140 people, 61 households, and 45 families residing in the town. The population density was 403.0 inhabitants per square mile (155.6/km^{2}). There were 65 housing units at an average density of 187.1 per square mile (72.2/km^{2}). The racial makeup of the town was 99.29% White, 0.00% Black or African American, 0.00% Native American, 0.00% Asian, 0.00% Pacific Islander, 0.00% from other races, and 0.71% from two or more races. 0.00% of the population were Hispanic or Latino of any race.

There were 61 households, out of which 21.3% had children under the age of 18 living with them, 59.0% were married couples living together, 11.5% had a female householder with no husband present, and 26.2% were non-families. 24.6% of all households were made up of individuals, and 13.1% had someone living alone who was 65 years of age or older. The average household size was 2.30 and the average family size was 2.71.

In the town, the population was spread out, with 16.4% under the age of 18, 6.4% from 18 to 24, 33.6% from 25 to 44, 31.4% from 45 to 64, and 12.1% who were 65 years of age or older. The median age was 43 years. For every 100 females, there were 97.2 males. For every 100 females age 18 and over, there were 98.3 males.

The median income for a household in the town was $26,875, and the median income for a family was $33,750. Males had a median income of $32,813 versus $20,313 for females. The per capita income for the town was $13,531. 13.0% of the population and 12.2% of families were below the poverty line. Out of the total people living in poverty, 10.7% were under the age of 18 and 10.5% were 65 or older.

== Education ==
Gaylesville is served by Gaylesville School (PK-12), home of the Trojans, which is a member of the Cherokee County School System.

Gaylesville Public Schools are part of the Cherokee County Schools. Schools in the district include Cedar Bluff School, Centre Elementary School, Gaylesville School, Sand Rock School, Centre Middle School, Cherokee County High School, Spring Garden High School and Cherokee County Career & Technology Center.

Mitchell Guice is the Superintendent of Schools.

== Notable people ==
- Donnell L. Cunningham, Arizona Supreme Court justice
- James S. Davenport, former U.S. Representative from Oklahoma
