= Tommie Bass =

American herbalist

Arthur Lee "Tommie" Bass (January 24, 1908 – August 28, 1996) was an Appalachian herbalist who lived near Lookout Mountain, Alabama.

At the time of his death at age 88 on August 31, 1996, Bass was one of the best-known local herbalists in the United States. He was profiled on the pages of the Wall Street Journal in 1985, subject of a film on his life, interviewed on national television, subject of a master's thesis and subject of scholarly and popular books. Bass's immense knowledge of herbal lore encompassed more than 300 local plants in his personal pharmacopoeia and others that might not be useful to "give ease" to others. He was well known for his tinctures, salves and compounds.

To quote his apprentice, Darryl Patton:

There are many 'Herbalists' around recommending all sorts of strange herbal treatments. But they have absolutely no knowledge of what a medicinal plant looks like in the woods and outside of a bottle. These herbal "pharmacists" come and go like every other fad. Tommie and those who follow in his footsteps will continue to use simple herbs for healing.
