= Collinsville, Alabama =

- Town
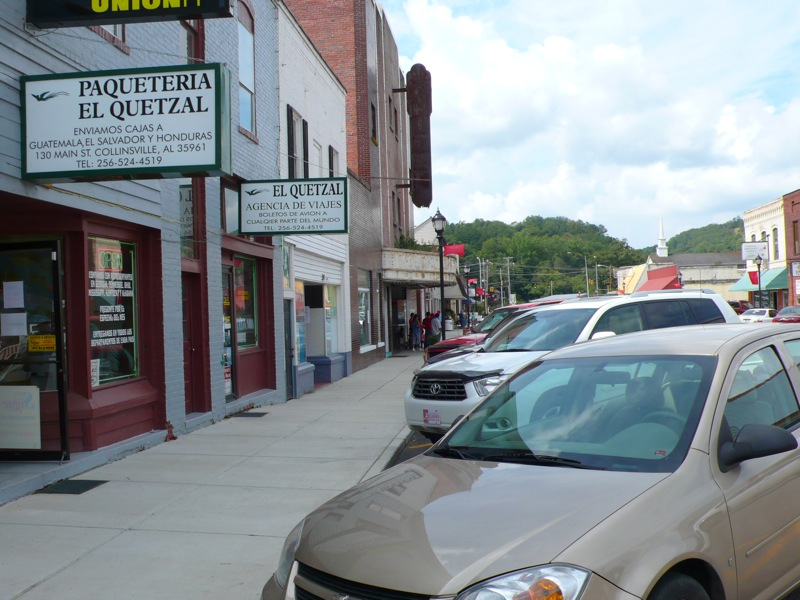
- Downtown Collinsville, Alabama

- Logo

- Location of Collinsville in DeKalb County, Alabama.
- Coordinates: 34°15′55″N 85°51′41″W
- Country: United States
- State: Alabama
- Counties: DeKalb

Area
  - Total: 3.41 sq mi (8.82 km^{2})
  - Land: 3.34 sq mi (8.66 km^{2})
  - Water: 0.062 sq mi (0.16 km^{2})
- Elevation: 791 ft (241 m)

Population (2020)
  - Total: 2,059
  - Density: 615.6/sq mi (237.67/km^{2})
- Time zone: UTC-6 (Central (CST))
  - Summer (DST): UTC-5 (CDT)
- ZIP code: 35961
- Area code: 256
- FIPS code: 01-16600
- GNIS feature ID: 2406296
- Website: www.collinsvillealabama.net

Collinsville is a town in DeKalb and Cherokee counties in the U.S. state of Alabama. It was incorporated in 1887. As of the 2020 census, Collinsville had a population of 2,059.

Collinsville's largest employer is Koch Foods. It is a poultry plant that employs approximately 800 people.

== Geography ==
Collinsville is located in southern DeKalb County. A small portion extends southeast along Alabama State Route 68 into Cherokee County. The town is located in the Little Wills Valley, between Lookout Mountain to the east and the smaller Big Ridge to the west.

According to the U.S. Census Bureau, the town has a total area of 3.9 square miles (10.2 km^{2}), of which 0.019 square miles (0.05 km^{2}), or 0.44%, is water.

== Demographics ==
Historical population
Census	Pop.	Note	%±
1880	160		—
1890	367		129.4%
1900	524		42.8%
1910	673		28.4%
1920	793		17.8%
1930	892		12.5%
1940	957		7.3%
1950	1,023		6.9%
1960	1,199		17.2%
1970	1,300		8.4%
1980	1,383		6.4%
1990	1,429		3.3%
2000	1,644		15.0%
2010	1,983		20.6%
2020	2,059		3.8%
U.S. Decennial Census; 2013 Estimate

=== Racial and ethnic composition ===
Collinsville town, Alabama – Racial and ethnic composition Note: the US Census treats Hispanic/Latino as an ethnic category. This table excludes Latinos from the racial categories and assigns them to a separate category. Hispanics/Latinos may be of any race. Race and ethnicity was not surveyed for populations under 2,500 in the 1980 census and under 1,000 in 1990 census.
Race / Ethnicity (NH = Non-Hispanic)	Pop 1990	Pop 2000	Pop 2010	Pop 2020	% 1990	% 2000	% 2010	% 2020
White alone (NH)	1,097	946	891	723	76.77%	57.54%	44.93%	35.11%
Black or African American alone (NH)	305	264	179	144	21.34%	16.06%	9.03%	6.99%
Native American or Alaska Native alone (NH)	16	22	18	13	1.12%	1.34%	0.91%	0.63%
Asian alone (NH)	0	1	2	5	0.00%	0.06%	0.10%	0.24%
Native Hawaiian or Pacific Islander alone (NH)	x	0	4	0	x	0.00%	0.20%	0.00%
Other race alone (NH)	0	3	2	3	0.00%	0.18%	0.10%	0.15%
Mixed race or Multiracial (NH)	x	22	32	55	x	1.34%	1.61%	2.67%
Hispanic or Latino (any race)	11	386	855	1,116	0.77%	23.48%	43.12%	54.20%
Total	1,429	1,644	1,983	2,059	100.00%	100.00%	100.00%	100.00%

=== 2020 census ===
As of the 2020 census, Collinsville had a population of 2,059. The median age was 31.7 years. 31.3% of residents were under the age of 18 and 16.9% of residents were 65 years of age or older. For every 100 females, there were 88.6 males, and for every 100 females age 18 and over, there were 85.3 males age 18 and over.

0.0% of residents lived in urban areas, while 100.0% lived in rural areas.

There were 607 households in Collinsville, of which 48.3% had children under the age of 18 living in them. Of all households, 43.3% were married-couple households, 20.9% were households with a male householder and no spouse or partner present, and 31.8% were households with a female householder and no spouse or partner present. About 23.0% of all households were made up of individuals and 9.7% had someone living alone who was 65 years of age or older.

There were 670 housing units, of which 9.4% were vacant. The homeowner vacancy rate was 1.2% and the rental vacancy rate was 6.1%.

=== 2010 census ===
As of the 2010 census Collinsville had a population of 1,983. The racial and ethnic composition of the population was 44.9% non-Hispanic white, 9.0% black or African American, 1.1% Native American, 0.1% Asian, 2.1% Pacific Islander (all of whom where Guamanian or Chamorro), 36.8% reporting some other race and 3.0% from two or more races. 43.1% of the population was Hispanic or Latino of any race.

=== 2000 census ===
As of the census of 2000, there were 1,644 people, 565 households, and 367 families residing in the town. The population density was 465.8 inhabitants per square mile (179.8/km^{2}). There were 629 housing units at an average density of 178.2 per square mile (68.8/km^{2}). The racial makeup of the town was 63.32% White, 16.18% Black or African American, 1.52% Native American, 0.85% Asian, 13.99% from other races, and 4.14% from two or more races. 23.48% of the population were Hispanic or Latino of any race.

There were 565 households, out of which 29.9% had children under the age of 18 living with them, 40.4% were married couples living together, 18.2% had a female householder with no husband present, and 35.0% were non-families. 29.4% of all households were made up of individuals, and 15.2% had someone living alone who was 65 years of age or older. The average household size was 2.62 and the average family size was 3.20.

In the town, the population was spread out, with 24.1% under the age of 18, 10.3% from 18 to 24, 24.4% from 25 to 44, 19.2% from 45 to 64, and 22.0% who were 65 years of age or older. The median age was 36 years. For every 100 females, there were 90.9 males. For every 100 females age 18 and over, there were 85.4 males.

The median income for a household in the town was $21,964, and the median income for a family was $27,500. Males had a median income of $20,114 versus $16,635 for females. The per capita income for the town was $13,042. About 22.2% of families and 25.7% of the population were below the poverty line, including 33.3% of those under age 18 and 27.0% of those age 65 or over.

== Education ==
The town is served by Collinsville Elementary School (K-6) and Collinsville High School (7-12), home of the Panthers. The CHS football team was the first football team in DeKalb County. The Panthers' first team was in 1920. The schedule in 1920 included a regular season game vs. Jacksonville State University. Collinsville currently competes in Class 3A.

The schools are members of the DeKalb County School System.

Collinsville High School athletic teams have won 4 state championships:

- Boys Basketball - 1975 (1A)
- Boys Soccer - 2013 (1A-4A)
- Girls Basketball - 2020 (2A)
- Boys Soccer - 2025 (3A)

== Climate ==
The climate in this area is characterized by hot, humid summers and generally mild to cool winters. According to the Köppen Climate Classification system, Collinsville has a humid subtropical climate, abbreviated "Cfa" on climate maps.

== Tourism ==
Collinsville is home to the Collinsville Trade Day, which is held every Saturday. It is estimated that 10,000 people visit the trade day each week, a number which may reach 30,000 in spring. The trade day was originally located outside the city limits, but was annexed in 2004.

== Notable person ==
- Jeanne Appleton Voltz, food journalist, editor, and cookbook author
