= Tennga, Georgia =

Unincorporated community in Georgia, U.S.

- Unincorporated Community
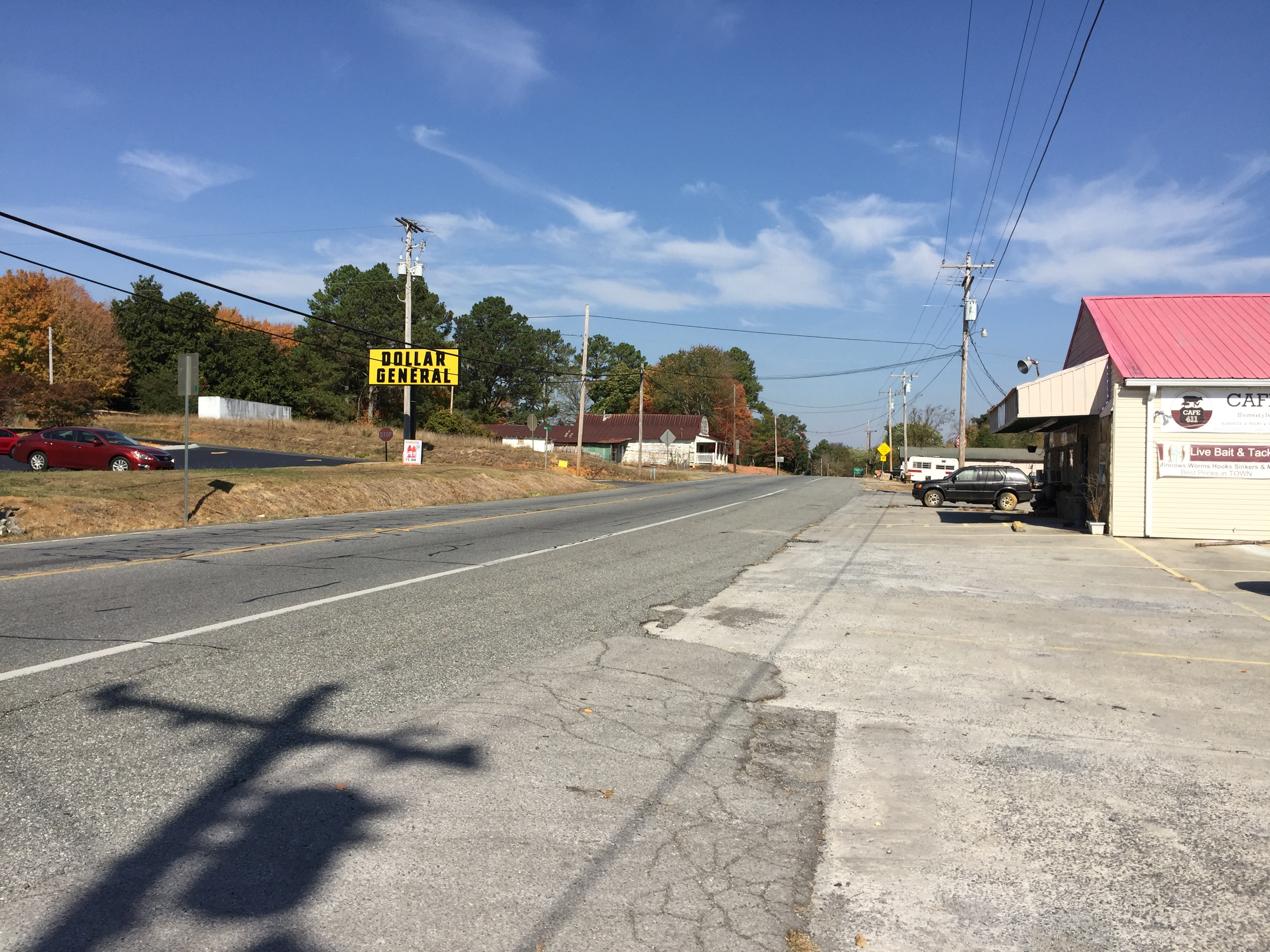
- U.S. Route 411 in Tennga, Georgia, October 2016
- Interactive map of Tennga, Georgia
- Country: United States
- States: Georgia
- County: Murray County, Georgia
- Elevation: 890 ft (270 m)

Tennga is a small unincorporated community in Murray County, Georgia, United States, along U.S. Route 411 at the Tennessee border.

== History ==
The border community's name is locational, being a portmanteau of the "Tenn." and "Ga." state abbreviations.

On March 28, 2000, Tennga was the site of a collision between Murray County School District school bus number 98-08 and a 33-car southbound CSX freight train led by GE C40-8 7580, which resulted in the deaths of three children at a railroad crossing. The railroad roughly parallels U.S. 411, and is likewise a well-used shortcut around Chattanooga for traffic between Atlanta and Knoxville.

== Geography ==
Tennga is located at 34.98718°N 84.73842°W, at an elevation of 887 feet (270 m) above sea level.
