= Centre–Piedmont–Cherokee County Regional Airport =

- IATA: none; ICAO: KPYP; FAA LID: PYP

Summary
- Airport type: Public
- Owner: CPCCR Airport Authority
- Serves: Centre, Alabama, U.S.
- Elevation AMSL: 595 ft (181 m)
- Coordinates: 34°05′24″N 085°36′36″W
- Interactive map of Centre–Piedmont–Cherokee County Regional Airport

Runways
Direction	Length		Surface
Direction	ft	m	Surface
7/25	5,500	1,676	Asphalt

Statistics (2017)
- Aircraft operations: 0
- Based aircraft: 15
- Source: Federal Aviation Administration

Centre–Piedmont–Cherokee County Regional Airport (ICAO: KPYP, FAA LID: PYP) is a public-use airport in Cherokee County, Alabama, United States. The airport is located five nautical miles (9 km) south of Centre, Alabama and 10 nautical miles (12 mi; 19 km) north of Piedmont, Alabama. It is owned by the CPCCR Airport Authority and was dedicated on October 14, 2010.

This airport is included in the FAA's National Plan of Integrated Airport Systems for 2011–2015 which categorized it as a general aviation facility.

This airport is assigned a three-letter location identifier of PYP by the Federal Aviation Administration, but it does not have an International Air Transport Association (IATA) airport code.

== Facilities ==
Centre–Piedmont–Cherokee County Regional Airport covers an area of 308 acres (125 ha) at an elevation of 595 feet (181 m) above mean sea level. It has one runway designated 7/25 with an asphalt surface measuring 5,500 by 100 feet (1,676 by 30 m).

== See also ==
- Centre Municipal Airport
- List of airports in Alabama
