= Centre, Alabama =

City in and county seat of Cherokee County, Alabama

Centre
- City
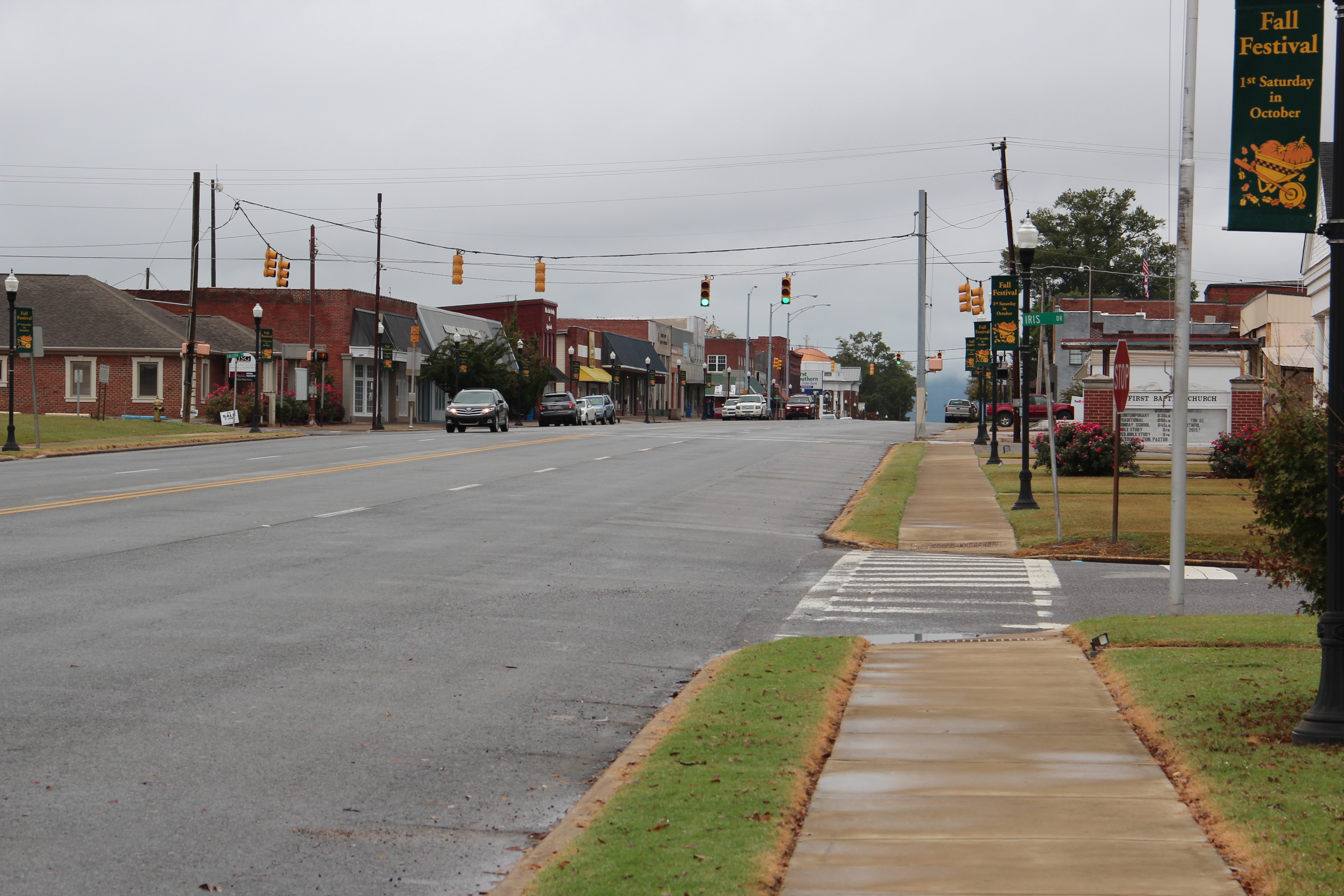
- Downtown Centre

- Seal

- Location of Centre in Cherokee County, Alabama.
- Coordinates: 34°08′10″N 85°39′18″W
- Country: United States
- State: Alabama
- County: Cherokee

Government
  - Type: Mayor/Council

Area
  - Total: 11.76 sq mi (30.45 km^{2})
  - Land: 11.70 sq mi (30.31 km^{2})
  - Water: 0.054 sq mi (0.14 km^{2})
- Elevation: 600 ft (180 m)

Population (2020)
  - Total: 3,587
  - Density: 306.5/sq mi (118.34/km^{2})
- Time zone: UTC-6 (Central (CST))
  - Summer (DST): UTC-5 (CDT)
- ZIP code: 35960
- Area code: 256
- FIPS code: 01-13648
- GNIS feature ID: 2404025
- Website: centreal.gov

Centre is a city in Cherokee County, Alabama, United States. At the 2020 census, the population was 3,587. The city is the county seat of Cherokee County.

== History ==
Cherokee County was established on January 9, 1836, and named after the Cherokee people who once lived in the area. The famous Cherokee chief, Pathkiller, lived in Turkeytown near the present town of Centre. In 1836 the newly founded town of Cedar Bluff became the county seat, but in 1844 the county seat was moved to the more centrally located town of Centre. The name was chosen, and carries the British English spelling, because of this central location in the county. In 2011, Centre began allowing the sale of alcoholic beverages, and is no longer a dry city.

== Geography ==
Centre is located slightly west of the center of Cherokee County. The city limits extend north to the south shore of Weiss Lake on the Coosa River.

U.S. Route 411 and Alabama State Route 68 run to the north of the city as a bypass, with US-411 leading east 22 mi (35 km) to Cave Spring, Georgia, and northwest 5 mi (8.0 km) to Leesburg. Alabama State Route 9 also runs through the city, leading northeast 6 mi (9.7 km) to Cedar Bluff with AL-68, and south 18 mi (29 km) to Piedmont.

According to the U.S. Census Bureau, the city has a total area of 11.5 square miles (29.9 km^{2}), of which 11.4 square miles (29.6 km^{2}) is land and 0.08 square miles (0.2 km^{2}), or 0.81%, is water.

=== Climate ===
Climate data for Centre, Alabama, 1991–2020 normals, extremes 2002–present
Month	Jan	Feb	Mar	Apr	May	Jun	Jul	Aug	Sep	Oct	Nov	Dec	Year
Record high °F (°C)	80 (27)	84 (29)	87 (31)	89 (32)	94 (34)	103 (39)	104 (40)	104 (40)	99 (37)	98 (37)	87 (31)	76 (24)	104 (40)
Mean maximum °F (°C)	70.6 (21.4)	72.7 (22.6)	80.6 (27.0)	85.1 (29.5)	89.5 (31.9)	95.0 (35.0)	96.4 (35.8)	96.2 (35.7)	93.0 (33.9)	86.5 (30.3)	76.4 (24.7)	70.5 (21.4)	98.1 (36.7)
Mean daily maximum °F (°C)	50.7 (10.4)	55.3 (12.9)	64.2 (17.9)	73.2 (22.9)	80.1 (26.7)	86.4 (30.2)	89.8 (32.1)	89.0 (31.7)	84.1 (28.9)	74.2 (23.4)	62.7 (17.1)	53.4 (11.9)	71.9 (22.2)
Daily mean °F (°C)	39.7 (4.3)	43.3 (6.3)	51.2 (10.7)	59.1 (15.1)	67.1 (19.5)	74.8 (23.8)	78.1 (25.6)	77.5 (25.3)	71.9 (22.2)	61.0 (16.1)	49.6 (9.8)	42.7 (5.9)	59.7 (15.4)
Mean daily minimum °F (°C)	28.7 (−1.8)	31.3 (−0.4)	38.2 (3.4)	45.1 (7.3)	54.1 (12.3)	63.2 (17.3)	66.5 (19.2)	65.9 (18.8)	59.8 (15.4)	47.8 (8.8)	36.5 (2.5)	31.9 (−0.1)	47.4 (8.6)
Mean minimum °F (°C)	13.5 (−10.3)	17.9 (−7.8)	24.2 (−4.3)	32.4 (0.2)	42.5 (5.8)	56.6 (13.7)	59.9 (15.5)	59.3 (15.2)	48.6 (9.2)	34.0 (1.1)	22.6 (−5.2)	19.8 (−6.8)	11.7 (−11.3)
Record low °F (°C)	−1 (−18)	9 (−13)	17 (−8)	24 (−4)	35 (2)	50 (10)	53 (12)	49 (9)	41 (5)	26 (−3)	15 (−9)	7 (−14)	−1 (−18)
Average precipitation inches (mm)	5.19 (132)	5.54 (141)	5.62 (143)	4.78 (121)	4.52 (115)	4.70 (119)	4.67 (119)	4.60 (117)	4.20 (107)	3.64 (92)	4.30 (109)	5.32 (135)	57.08 (1,450)
Average precipitation days (≥ 0.01 in)	10.6	12.3	8.8	7.4	8.3	9.6	9.8	10.1	6.9	8.0	6.9	11.4	110.1
Source 1: NOAA
Source 2: National Weather Service (mean maxima/minima, precip days 2006–2020)

== Demographics ==
Historical population
Census	Pop.	Note	%±
1850	250		—
1880	144		—
1890	347		141.0%
1900	282		−18.7%
1940	1,012		—
1950	1,672		65.2%
1960	2,392		43.1%
1970	2,418		1.1%
1980	2,351		−2.8%
1990	2,893		23.1%
2000	3,216		11.2%
2010	3,489		8.5%
2020	3,587		2.8%
U.S. Decennial Census; 2013 Estimate

=== Racial and ethnic composition ===
Centre city, Alabama – Racial and ethnic composition Note: the US Census treats Hispanic/Latino as an ethnic category. This table excludes Latinos from the racial categories and assigns them to a separate category. Hispanics/Latinos may be of any race. Race and ethnicity were not surveyed for populations under 2,500 in the 1980 census and under 1,000 in the 1990 census.
Race / Ethnicity (NH = Non-Hispanic)	Pop 1990	Pop 2000	Pop 2010	Pop 2020	% 1990	% 2000	% 2010	% 2020
White alone (NH)	2,576	2,807	3,014	3,074	89.04%	87.28%	86.39%	85.70%
Black or African American alone (NH)	284	322	345	259	9.82%	10.01%	9.89%	7.22%
Native American or Alaska Native alone (NH)	11	12	13	10	0.38%	0.37%	0.37%	0.28%
Asian alone (NH)	3	4	10	22	0.10%	0.12%	0.29%	0.61%
Native Hawaiian or Pacific Islander alone (NH)	x	0	0	0	x	0.00%	0.00%	0.00%
Other race alone (NH)	0	1	6	10	0.00%	0.03%	0.17%	0.28%
Mixed race or Multiracial (NH)	x	39	60	135	x	1.21%	1.72%	3.76%
Hispanic or Latino (any race)	19	31	41	77	0.66%	0.96%	1.18%	2.15%
Total	2,893	3,216	3,489	3,587	100.00%	100.00%	100.00%	100.00%

=== 2020 census ===
As of the 2020 census, Centre had a population of 3,587, with 1,453 households and 931 families.

The median age was 46.2 years. 19.7% of residents were under the age of 18 and 26.4% of residents were 65 years of age or older. For every 100 females there were 88.8 males, and for every 100 females age 18 and over there were 84.9 males age 18 and over.

0.0% of residents lived in urban areas, while 100.0% lived in rural areas.

There were 1,453 households in Centre, of which 28.1% had children under the age of 18 living in them. Of all households, 39.0% were married-couple households, 19.6% were households with a male householder and no spouse or partner present, and 35.7% were households with a female householder and no spouse or partner present. About 35.6% of all households were made up of individuals and 20.5% had someone living alone who was 65 years of age or older.

There were 1,713 housing units, of which 15.2% were vacant. The homeowner vacancy rate was 2.8% and the rental vacancy rate was 9.1%.

=== 2010 census ===
As of the census of 2010, there were 3,489 people, 1,426 households, and 880 families residing in the city. The population density was 305 inhabitants per square mile (118/km^{2}). There were 1,690 housing units at an average density of 147 per square mile (57/km^{2}). The racial makeup of the city was 87.0% White, 9.9% Black or African American, 0.4% Native American, 0.3% Asian, 0.3% from other races, and 2.1% from two or more races. 1.2% of the population were Hispanic or Latino of any race.

There were 1,426 households, out of which 24.5% had children under the age of 18 living with them, 42.5% were married couples living together, 14.6% had a female householder with no husband present, and 38.3% were non-families. 35.3% of all households were made up of individuals, and 17.6% had someone living alone who was 65 years of age or older. The average household size was 2.24 and the average family size was 2.88.

In the city, the population was spread out, with 19.9% under the age of 18, 8.4% from 18 to 24, 20.4% from 25 to 44, 26.8% from 45 to 64, and 24.5% who were 65 years of age or older. The median age was 45.9 years. For every 100 females, there were 86.1 males. For every 100 females age 18 and over, there were 97.5 males.

The median income for a household in the city was $40,564, and the median income for a family was $44,665. Males had a median income of $43,816 versus $24,043 for females. The per capita income for the city was $20,491. About 14.7% of families and 21.8% of the population were below the poverty line, including 42.0% of those under age 18 and 1.8% of those age 65 or over.

== Education ==
Centre Public Schools are part of Cherokee County Schools (Alabama). Schools in the district include Cedar Bluff School, Centre Elementary School, Gaylesville School, Sand Rock School, Centre Middle School, Cherokee County High School, Spring Garden High School and Cherokee County Career & Technology Center.

The Cherokee County Board of Education provides public education for Centre.

Schools in Centre include Cherokee County High School, Cherokee County Career and Technology Center, Centre Middle School, and Centre Elementary School.

== Media ==
=== Radio stations ===
- WEIS 990 AM 100.5FM (Country; gospel music after 6 and all day Sunday)
- WKLS 105.9 FM (Rock)

=== Newspaper ===
- Cherokee County Herald (weekly)
- The Post (weekly)

== Recreation ==
Centre is located near Weiss Lake, a man-made reservoir and self-proclaimed "Crappie Capital of the World".

== Transportation and Infrastructure ==
Centre is served by Centre–Piedmont–Cherokee County Regional Airport for general aviation, though no regularly-schedules commercial aviation flies directly to Centre. The closest commercial airports are Hartsfield–Jackson Atlanta International Airport and Birmingham–Shuttlesworth International Airport, both of which are a roughly-equal distance to Centre.

No US Interstate highways pass directly though Centre. The closest Interstate highways are Interstate 759 and Interstate 59, which are accessible from the nearby city of Gadsden. Centre itself is served by Alabama State Route 58 and U.S. Route 411; the two roads intersect at the city centre.

== Notable people ==
- Greg Jelks, baseball player
- Jason LaRay Keener, filmmaker
- Benjamin A. Poore, U.S. Army major general
- John Ross, Cherokee leader
