= Chattooga River (Alabama–Georgia) =

River in the Southeastern U.S.

Physical characteristics
- Source
  - location: LaFayette, GA
  - coordinates: 34.59891°N 85.34544°W
- Mouth
  - coordinates: 34.25580°N 85.56650°W

The Chattooga River runs 64.4 miles (103.6 km) through northwest Georgia and northeast Alabama in the United States. The river begins in Walker County, Georgia, and flows southwest into Weiss Lake on the Coosa River in Alabama. This river is one of two rivers named Chattooga in the state of Georgia. The other, more famous Chattooga River forms part of the boundary between Georgia and South Carolina, and was the wild river featured in the book and movie Deliverance. The name Chattooga is likely from the Cherokee word gatsugi, which means "I have crossed".
