= Shinbone Ridge =

Ridge in Alabama and Georgia, USA

Coordinates: 34°40′11.11″N 85°20′37.16″W

Shinbone Ridge is a ridge in the U.S. states of Alabama and Georgia.

Shinbone Ridge was named after the shinbone in the skeletal system of the horse. This is a continuation of horse-themed natural feature names in the area; cf. Horseleg Mountain.
