= Cedar Bluff, Alabama =

- Town
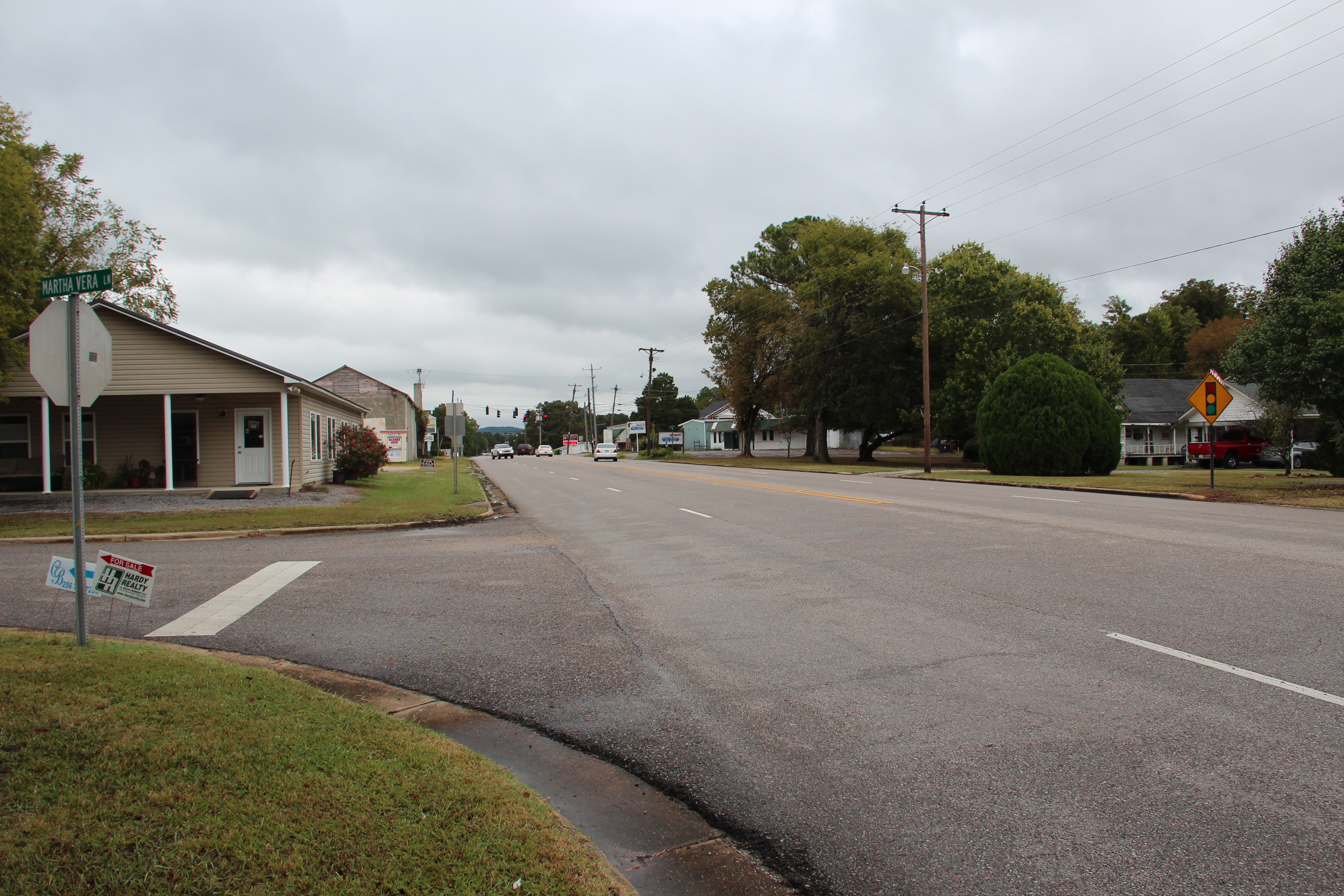
- Weiss Lake Drive

- Flag
- Motto: "You can stop looking for the good life. We found it."
- Location of Cedar Bluff in Cherokee County, Alabama.
- Coordinates: 34°13′28″N 85°36′05″W
- Country: United States
- State: Alabama
- County: Cherokee

Area
  - Total: 4.82 sq mi (12.49 km^{2})
  - Land: 4.81 sq mi (12.46 km^{2})
  - Water: 0.015 sq mi (0.04 km^{2})
- Elevation: 587 ft (179 m)

Population (2020)
  - Total: 1,845
  - Density: 383.7/sq mi (148.13/km^{2})
- Time zone: UTC-6 (Central (CST))
  - Summer (DST): UTC-5 (CDT)
- ZIP code: 35959
- Area code: 256
- FIPS code: 01-12760
- GNIS feature ID: 2406240
- Website: www.cedarbluff-al.org

Cedar Bluff is a town in Cherokee County, Alabama, United States. At the 2020 census, the population was 1,845. Unlike the rest of the county, Cedar Bluff is a wet town. Cedar Bluff is located on the north shore of Weiss Lake, noted for its crappie fishing.

== History ==
A post office called Cedar Bluff has been in operation since 1837. Once the county seat from about 1836 to 1844 before being removed to Centre, the city was named for groves of cedar trees above the bluffs of the nearby river.

The Cornwall Furnace near Cedar Bluff is listed on the National Register of Historic Places.

== Geography ==
Cedar Bluff is located northeast of the center of Cherokee County. The town is bordered on the north, west, and south by Weiss Lake.

According to the U.S. Census Bureau, the town has a total area of 5.1 square miles (13.3 km^{2}), of which 5.1 square miles (13.1 km^{2}) is land and 0.08 square miles (0.2 km^{2}), or 1.15%, is water.

== Demographics ==
Historical population
Census	Pop.	Note	%±
1880	85		—
1890	194		128.2%
1920	418		—
1950	563		—
1960	687		22.0%
1970	956		39.2%
1980	1,129		18.1%
1990	1,174		4.0%
2000	1,467		25.0%
2010	1,820		24.1%
2020	1,845		1.4%
U.S. Decennial Census; 2013 Estimate

=== Racial and ethnic composition ===
Cedar Bluff town, Alabama – Racial and ethnic composition Note: the US Census treats Hispanic/Latino as an ethnic category. This table excludes Latinos from the racial categories and assigns them to a separate category. Hispanics/Latinos may be of any race. Race and ethnicity were not surveyed for populations under 2,500 in 1980 and under 1,000 in 1990.
Race / Ethnicity (NH = Non-Hispanic)	Pop 1990	Pop 2000	Pop 2010	Pop 2020	% 1990	% 2000	% 2010	% 2020
White alone (NH)	930	1,270	1,558	1,577	79.22%	86.57%	85.60%	85.47%
Black or African American alone (NH)	234	164	181	140	19.93%	11.18%	9.95%	7.59%
Native American or Alaska Native alone (NH)	0	4	12	18	0.00%	0.27%	0.66%	0.98%
Asian alone (NH)	3	3	6	9	0.26%	0.20%	0.33%	0.49%
Native Hawaiian or Pacific Islander alone (NH)	x	0	0	0	x	0.00%	0.00%	0.00%
Other race alone (NH)	0	0	3	7	0.00%	0.00%	0.16%	0.38%
Mixed race or Multiracial (NH)	x	13	38	64	x	0.89%	2.09%	3.47%
Hispanic or Latino (any race)	7	13	22	30	0.60%	0.89%	1.21%	1.63%
Total	1,174	1,467	1,820	1,845	100.00%	100.00%	100.00%	100.00%

=== 2020 census ===
As of the 2020 census, there were 1,845 people, 788 households, and 507 families residing in the town. The median age was 46.6 years. 20.5% of residents were under the age of 18 and 22.9% were 65 years of age or older. For every 100 females there were 97.1 males, and for every 100 females age 18 and over there were 93.0 males age 18 and over.

0.0% of residents lived in urban areas, while 100.0% lived in rural areas.

Of the 788 households, 28.6% had children under the age of 18 living in them. Of all households, 45.2% were married-couple households, 19.2% were households with a male householder and no spouse or partner present, and 29.9% were households with a female householder and no spouse or partner present. About 30.3% of all households were made up of individuals and 14.1% had someone living alone who was 65 years of age or older.

There were 1,027 housing units, of which 23.3% were vacant. The homeowner vacancy rate was 1.0% and the rental vacancy rate was 5.9%.

=== 2010 census ===
As of the census of 2010, there were 1,820 people, 766 households, and 521 families residing in the town. The population density was 359 inhabitants per square mile (139/km^{2}). There were 1,302 housing units at an average density of 255 per square mile (98/km^{2}). The racial makeup of the town was 86.2% White, 9.9% Black or African American, 0.7% Native American, 0.3% Asian, 0.5% from other races, and 2.4% from two or more races. 1.2% of the population were Hispanic or Latino of any race.

There were 766 households, out of which 21.9% had children under the age of 18 living with them, 49.0% were married couples living together, 14.4% had a female householder with no husband present, and 32.0% were non-families. 28.6% of all households were made up of individuals, and 12.8% had someone living alone who was 65 years of age or older. The average household size was 2.38 and the average family size was 2.87.

In the town, the population was spread out, with 21.4% under the age of 18, 8.6% from 18 to 24, 20.0% from 25 to 44, 30.9% from 45 to 64, and 19.0% who were 65 years of age or older. The median age was 45 years. For every 100 females, there were 93.6 males. For every 100 females age 18 and over, there were 92.9 males.

The median income for a household in the town was $35,143, and the median income for a family was $37,500. Males had a median income of $31,016 versus $26,583 for females. The per capita income for the town was $19,469. About 22.8% of families and 25.7% of the population were below the poverty line, including 41.0% of those under age 18 and 8.5% of those age 65 or over.

== Education ==
Cedar Bluff Public Schools are part of the Cherokee County Schools. Schools in the district include Cedar Bluff School, Centre Elementary School, Gaylesville School, Sand Rock School, Centre Middle School, Cherokee County High School, Spring Garden High School and Cherokee County Career & Technology Center. Cedar Bluff School is located in Cedar Bluff.

Mike Welch is the Superintendent of Schools.

== Notable people ==
- John L. Burnett, U.S. Representative from 1899 to 1919
- Tina Gordon, NASCAR driver
