= Area codes 256 and 938 =

Area codes for northern Alabama, United States

Coordinates: 34°8′N 85°58′W

Region covered by area code 256/938 in Alabama

Area codes 256 and 938 are telephone area codes in the North American Numbering Plan (NANP) for North Alabama and an eastern part of the state. The two area codes form an overlay complex for the same numbering plan area. Area code 256 was created in 1998, and 938 was added in 2010.

== History ==
Area code 256 was created on March 23, 1998, in an area code split of area code 205. A permissive dialing period, that permitted time to reprogram computers, cell phones, pagers and fax machines, allowed the use of 205 through September 28, 1998.

In March 2009, the Alabama Public Service Commission announced the state's first all-services overlay complex with new area code 938 for "sometime in 2011". As a result, ten-digit dialing was implemented in the area with voluntary compliance beginning on November 7, 2009, and mandatory use by June 5, 2010, instead of dialing only the 7-digit local telephone number. Area code 938 took effect on July 10, 2010. This timing roughly coincided with the end of the originally projected 12-year "lifespan" of the parent area code.

== Service area ==
The numbering plan area comprises north and northeast Alabama and includes the following metropolitan areas:

- Huntsville Metropolitan Area
- Decatur Metropolitan Area
- The Shoals
- Gadsden Metropolitan Statistical Area
- Anniston-Oxford Metropolitan Area

=== Counties ===
- Blount County (part, near Arab on Brindlee Mountain; most of Blount County is in area code 205)
- Calhoun County (part, some of Calhoun County is in area code 205)
- Cherokee County
- Clay County
- Cleburne County
- Colbert County
- Coosa County
- Cullman County
- DeKalb County
- Elmore County (part, most of Elmore County is in area code 334)
- Etowah County (part, some of Etowah County is in area code 205)
- Franklin County (part, some of Franklin County is in area code 205)
- Jackson County
- Lawrence County
- Lauderdale County
- Limestone County
- Madison County
- Marshall County
- Morgan County
- Randolph County (part, some of Randolph County is in area code 334)
- Saint Clair County (part, the Steele area. Most of Saint Clair County is in area code 205)
- Talladega County (part, the Lincoln area is in area code 205)
- Tallapoosa County (part, some of Tallapoosa County is in area code 334)
- Winston County (part, most of Winston County is in area code 205)

=== Cities ===
- Albertville
- Alexander City
- Anniston
- Arab
- Ardmore
- Ashland
- Athens
- Attalla
- Boaz
- Bridgeport
- Cedar Bluff
- Centre
- Collinsville
- Crossville
- Courtland
- Cullman
- Dadeville
- Decatur
- Edwardsville
- Falkville
- Florence
- Fort Payne
- Gadsden
- Gaylesville
- Guntersville
- Hammondville
- Hanceville
- Hartselle
- Hazel Green
- Heflin
- Henagar
- Hobson City
- Hokes Bluff
- Huntsville
- Jacksonville
- Leesburg
- Littleville
- Lineville
- Madison
- Mentone
- Moulton
- Muscle Shoals
- Oxford
- Paint Rock
- Piedmont
- Priceville
- Rainbow City
- Rainsville
- Red Bay
- Reece City
- Rockford
- Russellville
- Saks
- Scottsboro
- Sheffield
- Somerville
- Stevenson
- Sylacauga
- Talladega
- Tanner
- Triana
- Tuscumbia
- Valley Head
- Weaver
- Wedowee

== See also ==
- List of Alabama area codes
- List of NANP area codes
- List of area code overlays

Alabama area codes: 205/659, 251, 256/938, 334
	North: 931	
West: 662, 205/659	256/938	East: 678/470/943, 706/762, 770
	South: 205/659, 334	
Tennessee area codes: 423, 615/629, 731, 865, 901, 931
Mississippi area codes: 228, 601/769, 471/662
Georgia area codes: 229, 404, 478, 678/470/943, 706/762, 770, 912
