= Weiss Lake =

Reservoir in northeastern Alabama

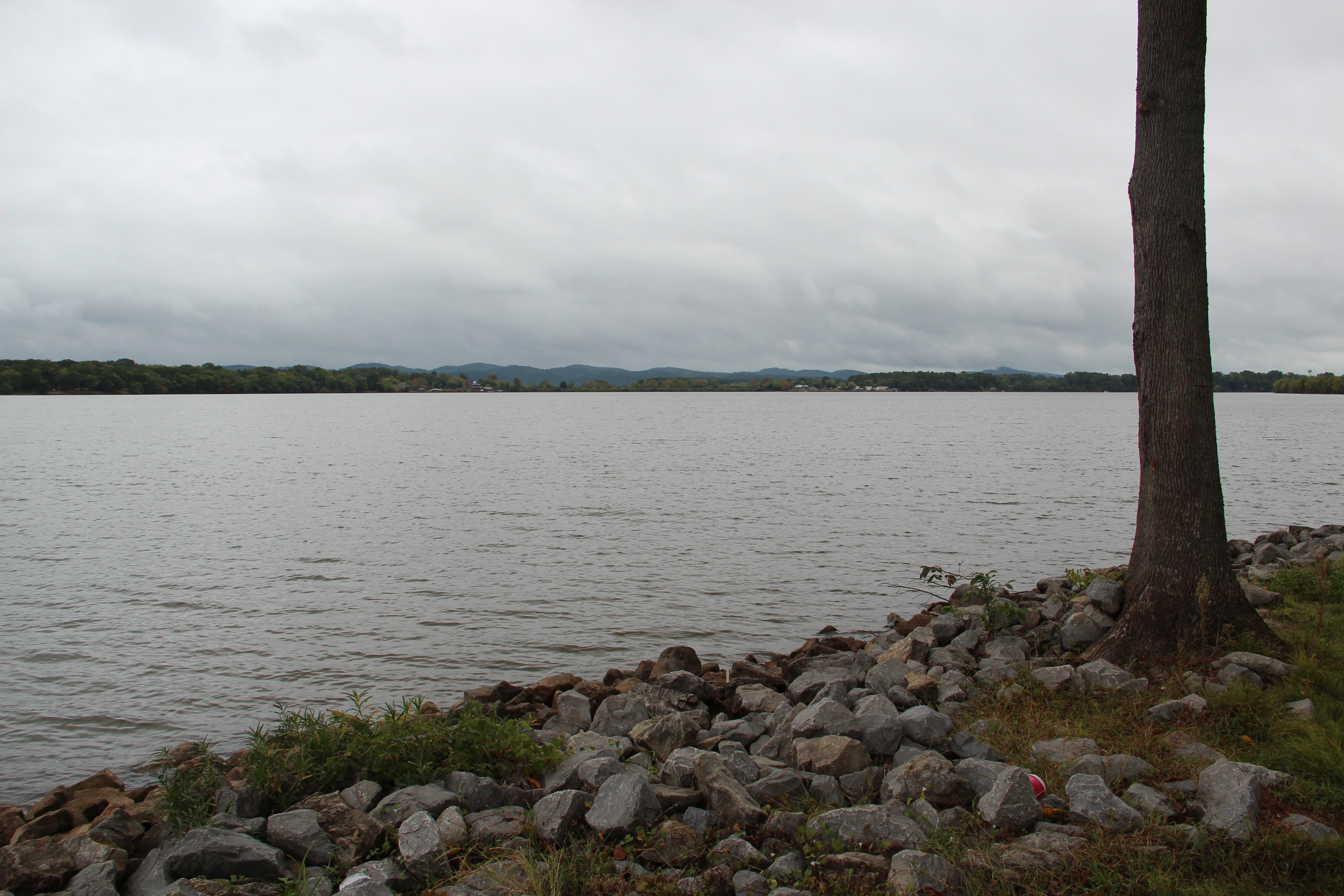
- Weiss Lake in 2015

- Location within Alabama Location within the United States
- Location: Cherokee County, Alabama / Floyd County, Georgia, US
- Coordinates: 34°10′16″N 85°45′15″W
- Type: reservoir
- Primary inflows: Coosa River, Chattooga River, Little River
- Basin countries: United States
- Surface area: 30,200 acres (12,200 ha)
- Max. depth: 62 ft (19 m)
- Shore length^{1}: 447 mi (719 km)
- Surface elevation: 564 ft (172 m)
- ^{1} Shore length is not a well-defined measure.

Weiss Lake in northeastern Alabama is owned and operated by the Alabama Power Company. At full summer pool, Weiss Lake sits 564 feet (172 m) above sea level. The lake covers 30,200 acres (122 km^{2}) from the Coosa River, Chattooga River (Alabama–Georgia) and Little River, offering over 447 miles (719 km) of shoreline and shallow flats, large coves, under-water drop offs and deep channels. Weiss Lake also has privately owned hotels, marinas, campgrounds and bait and tackle stores. There are 11 bridges that cross Weiss Lake.

Weiss Dam, creating the reservoir, was begun as the first of seven hydroelectric projects on the Coosa in 1958, and finished three years later. It is a concrete and earthen gravity dam, 126 feet (38 m) high, named after Fernand C. Weiss, a former chief engineer of Alabama Power. A book by local newspaper editor Douglas Scott Wright, titled A History of Weiss Lake, describes the decades-long battle to build a series of dams along the upper Coosa River, the farmers who tried to stop construction of Weiss Dam, the lake's namesake, and the ups and downs that the community have experienced since it was completed in June 1961.

Weiss Lake contains crappie, largemouth bass, and striped bass. In 2009, the population of bass consists of 15–18 inch preferred size bass as well as abundant numbers of young growing bass. The striped bass population primarily consist of 3–7 pound fish, but fish over 25 pounds have been caught as well. The best seasons for fishing crappie are March through May, yet September through November months are good as well. The best bass months are February through May, and in October and November. The Rome Sailing Club began at Garden Lakes in 1955, but moved to Weiss Lake in 1980.
