= Blue Pond =

Blue Pond may refer to:

- Blue Pond, Alabama, an unincorporated community in Cherokee County
- Blue Pond (Biei), a pond in Biei, Hokkaido, Japan.
