= Kuzuryū =

Japanese deity

Kuzuryū (九頭龍, nine-headed dragon), or Kuzuryūshin (九頭龍神, nine-headed dragon god) is a deity that appears in folklore and legends of various parts of Japan, including, for example, Hakone (Kanagawa), Nagano Prefecture and Fukui Prefecture. In many cases, the Kuzuryū is associated with water.

== Hakone Kuzuryū legend ==
During the Nara period, a legend arose that the Nine-headed Dragon had settled in Lake Ashi in Hakone, and that it demanded a sacrifice. To appease the dragon, the villagers agreed to select a house by shooting a white-feathered arrow and seeing where it landed, then sacrificing the daughter of the house. A priest named Mankan (Japanese: 万巻上人) cursed the dragon, and is said to have chained it to the Upside-down Cedar (an underwater rock formation). As a result of this legend, the dragon came to be worshipped as Kuzuryū Daimyōjin (九頭竜大明神, "Great God Nine-Headed Dragon). The expression "send up a white-feathered arrow" has come to mean "choose by lot."

The legend continues, saying Mankan saw the dragon reform and change into a Dragon King. He then built a shrine to the dragon. After this the customary offering to the dragon changed from human sacrifice to steamed rice with red beans.

== Hokkaido Kuzuryū legend ==
In the Edo period after the Zenkōji earthquake hit in 1847, causing many tragedies as well as Natural disasters. A pond in Hokkaido, Japan, named Aoiike was left empty after the quake, causing panic among the locals, hoping that a wandering cleric would pray for the water to return to the pond. The cleric would then build an altar in the Center of the pond for the kami Kuzuryū and complete a task of rituals. After demonstrating deep faith in Kuzuryū, water suddenly fills the pond back up again.

== Other Kuzuryū legends ==
=== Kuzuryū in Togakushi, Nagano prefecture ===
Kuzuryū is said to have appeared in response to the echoing sound of a rock door to a cave torn off by another god, and flung down to earth. The thrown door became Mount Togakushi, and Kuzuryū became a nearby mountain of the same name. At the foot of Mount Togakushi resides Togakushi Shrine, where a small shrine dedicated to the Kuzuryū can be found.

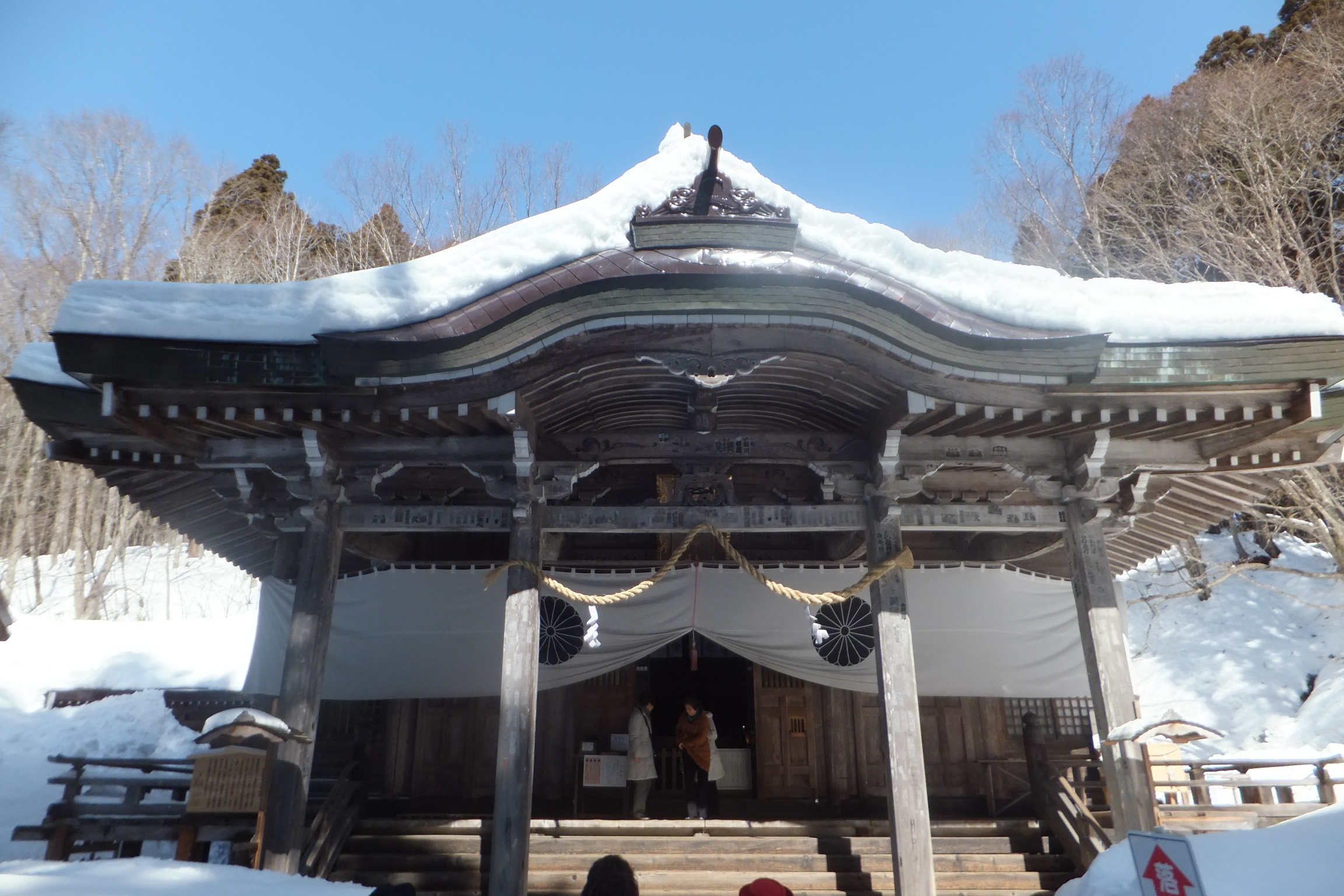
The Togakushi Shrine, where Kuzuryū is worshiped.

== Indian influence ==
Kuzuryū's origins can be traced to the Hindu deities Vāsuki and Śeṣa, Nāgarajas who guard Mount Meru. According to Hindu myth, Śeṣa was one of one thousand nāga offspring of Kaśyapa and Kadrū. His appearance is that of a giant snake with one thousand heads. The earrings, crown, and corolla attached to each one of one thousand heads depict are decorated with swastikas.

When Buddhism was introduced to China, Vāsuki was recognized as one of the Eight Great Nāga Kings. In Japan, due to the influence of Shintō on Buddhism, Vāsuki became a guardian deity in both religions. The Eight Nāga Kings became influential in the esoteric tradition, which has a strong focus on obtaining worldly benefits. This was reflected in Kuzuryū's role as a rainmaker deity. Kuzuryū is sometimes referred to as Kuzuryū Gongen, which refers to his identification with Vāsuki.

== See also ==
- Lake Ashi
- Lernaean Hydra
- Nagaraja
- Shesha
- Vasuki
- Yamata no Orochi
