= Bomar =

Bomar is a surname. Notable people with the surname include:

- Benjamin Bomar (1816–1868), American politician
- Lynn Bomar (1901–1964), American football player
- Maalik Bomar (born 1990), Canadian football player
- Mary A. Bomar (1944–2022), British-born American government official
- Rhett Bomar (born 1985), American football player
- Scott Bomar (born 1974), American musician
- William Purinton Bomar Jr. (1919–1991), American artist
- Samuel Scott Bomar (born 1968), American actor & entertainer

== See also ==
- Bomar, Alabama, unincorporated community
- Shelbyville Municipal Airport (Tennessee), also known as Bomar Field
