= Fort Likens =

United States historic site in Alabama

- Broomtown, Alabama in United States

Site information
- Type: Stockade fort
- Owner: Private
- Controlled by: Private
- Open to the public: No

Location
- Coordinates: 34°26′03″N 85°30′42″W

Site history
- Built: April 1838
- Built by: United States Army
- In use: 1838
- Demolished: July 1838
- Events: Cherokee removal

Fort Likens was a temporary stockade fort built in 1838 in present-day Cherokee County, Alabama. The fort was used to house soldiers who participated in the Cherokee removal.

After the Treaty of New Echota, the Cherokee were given two years to voluntarily relocate from their traditional homeland in the southeastern United States to Indian Territory. In 1838, the remaining Cherokees became subject to forcible removal. To assist in the removal process, the United States Army constructed thirty-three military posts. Five forts were established to house soldiers who participated in the removal, including Fort Payne (now modern Fort Payne), Fort Morrow (at Guntersville), Fort Lovell (at Cedar Bluff), and Fort Likens. Bellefonte, located in Jackson County, Alabama, became a mustering and supply depot. Soldiers were mustered into service in April 1838 by Major John Payne in New Echota. Captain Thomas Likens commanded one company of Mounted Alabama Volunteers.

In April 1838, construction began on Fort Likens. The fort was located in Broomtown Valley, near Barry Springs, and was named for Captain Likens. The fort was constructed of chestnut logs made into a circular stockade with twenty-foot high walls. Soldiers who were stationed at Fort Likens were mustered at Jacksonville, Alabama and sent to Bellefonte before arriving at Fort Likens.

Cherokee in the surrounding area were rounded up by soldiers from Fort Likens and forced into an internment camp located at nearby Barry Springs. After being held at Barry Springs, the Cherokee were moved to Fort Payne and eventually Indian Territory.

On July 4, 1838, soldiers from Fort Likens went to Cedar Bluff to participate in the town's Independence Day celebration.

By late July 1838, the Cherokee removal was essentially completed, and Fort Likens was no longer needed. The fort was dismantled, and the logs were purchased by a local family and used to build two barns, a house, and fence posts.

The site of Fort Likens has been identified but was disturbed by farming after the fort was dismantled. The area is now covered in pine trees. Archaeological investigations have been carried out at the site, and some military objects have been recovered.

A model of Fort Likens is on display at the Cherokee County Historical Museum.
