= Congo, Alabama =

Congo
- Unincorporated community
- Location in Alabama.
- Coordinates: 34°18′39″N 85°39′03″W
- Country: United States
- State: Alabama
- County: Cherokee
- Elevation: 663 ft (202 m)
- Time zone: UTC-6 (Central (CST))
  - Summer (DST): UTC-5 (CDT)
- Area codes: 256 & 938

Congo is an unincorporated community in Cherokee County, Alabama, United States.

== History ==
A post office called Congo was established in 1892, and remained in operation until it was discontinued in 1909. The name commemorates the expeditions made by David Livingstone to the African Congo.
