= Moshat, Alabama =

Moshat
- Unincorporated community
- Location in Alabama.
- Coordinates: 34°07′07″N 85°37′20″W
- Country: United States
- State: Alabama
- County: Cherokee
- Elevation: 673 ft (205 m)
- Time zone: UTC-6 (Central (CST))
  - Summer (DST): UTC-5 (CDT)
- Area codes: 256 & 938
- GNIS feature ID: 123107

Moshat is an unincorporated community in Cherokee County, Alabama, United States.

== History ==
A post office called Moshat was established in 1884, and remained in operation until it was discontinued in 1903. The Moshat family paid the community a visit and it was decided to name the place after them.
