= Willard Warner =

U.S. Senator from Alabama

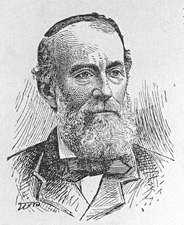

United States Senator from Alabama
- In office July 13, 1868 – March 3, 1871
- Preceded by: Clement Claiborne Clay (1861)
- Succeeded by: George Goldthwaite

Member of the Alabama House of Representatives

Member of the Ohio State Senate

Personal details
- Born: September 4, 1826 Granville, Ohio, U.S.
- Died: November 23, 1906 (aged 80) Chattanooga, Tennessee, U.S.
- Resting place: Cedar Hill Cemetery, Newark, Ohio

Military service
- Allegiance: United States of America; Union
- Branch/service: United States Army; Union Army
- Years of service: 1861–1865
- Rank: brevet Brigadier General
- Commands: 180th Ohio Infantry
- Battles/wars: American Civil War

Willard Warner (September 4, 1826 – November 23, 1906) was a brevet brigadier general in the Union Army during the American Civil War. He was a U.S. senator from the state of Alabama after the war.

== Early life and career ==
Warner was born in Granville, Ohio. His great-grandfather was Luke Knowlton, a founder of Newfane, Vermont, and a leader of Vermont during the American Revolution. He graduated from Marietta College, and founded the Newark Machine Works in Newark, Ohio. He was the brother-in-law of future Civil War general Charles R. Woods of Newark.

== Civil War ==
In December 1861, Warner joined the volunteer army as major of the 76th Ohio Infantry. He served in several battles in the western theater, including the Battle of Fort Donelson, the siege of Corinth, and the Vicksburg campaign. In 1863 he became lieutenant colonel of the regiment, which he led from Vicksburg to Chattanooga. He served on the staff of William T. Sherman during the Atlanta campaign as the inspector general.

In October 1864, he was named as colonel of the 180th Ohio Infantry. He received the brevet ranks of brigadier general and major general of volunteers to rank from March 13, 1865, and mustered out in July of that year.

He served one term in the Ohio State Senate immediately after the war, removed to the South in 1867, where he engaged in cotton-planting and was a member of the Alabama House of Representatives in the succeeding year. Elected upon readmission of Alabama to the Union, the Republican served as a Senator from July 13, 1868, to March 3, 1871, alongside George E. Spencer. He was the last Republican to hold the seat until Jeff Sessions' election in 1996. He did not win reelection, turned down Grant's tendered appointment as Governor of New Mexico, and returned to Alabama and later to Tennessee to pursue various business interests.

He was collector of customs at Mobile, Alabama, from July 1871 until February 1872, when he declined the appointment of Governor of New Mexico, as he did the diplomatic post of Minister to Argentina. He was a member of the Republican National Convention of 1868. In 1873 he organized the Tecumseh Iron Company, and in 1887 he was elected president of the Nashville Iron, Steel, and Charcoal Company.

He died in Chattanooga, Tennessee, and was buried in Cedar Hill Cemetery in Newark, Ohio.

== Notes ==
U.S. Senate
Preceded by vacant	U.S. senator (Class 2) from Alabama; 1868–1871; Served alongside: George E. Spencer	Succeeded by George Goldthwaite
