= Alexis, Alabama =

Alexis
- Unincorporated community
- Location in Alabama.
- Coordinates: 34°10′44″N 85°30′44″W
- Country: United States
- State: Alabama
- County: Cherokee
- Elevation: 604 ft (184 m)
- Time zone: UTC-6 (Central (CST))
  - Summer (DST): UTC-5 (CDT)
- Area codes: 256 & 938
- GNIS feature ID: 112987

Alexis is an unincorporated community in Cherokee County, in the U.S. state of Alabama.

== History ==
A post office called Alexis was established in 1884, and remained in operation until it was discontinued in 1906. Alexis is the Anglicization of a Cherokee name, according to local history.

== Demographics ==
According to the returns from 1850-2010 for Alabama, Alexis has never reported a population figure separately on the U.S. Census.
