= Elrath, Alabama =

Elrath
- Unincorporated community
- Location in Alabama.
- Coordinates: 34°08′17″N 85°44′35″W
- Country: United States
- State: Alabama
- County: Cherokee
- Elevation: 614 ft (187 m)
- Time zone: UTC-6 (Central (CST))
  - Summer (DST): UTC-5 (CDT)
- Area codes: 256 & 938
- GNIS feature ID: 156312

Elrath is an unincorporated community in Cherokee County, Alabama, United States.

== History ==
A post office called Elrath was in operation from 1892 until 1903. The community was named for Samuel McElrath, an early settler.
