= Newberry Crossroads, Alabama =

Newberry Crossroads
- Unincorporated community
- Location in Alabama.
- Coordinates: 34°09′46″N 85°34′20″W
- Country: United States
- State: Alabama
- County: Cherokee
- Elevation: 581 ft (177 m)
- Time zone: UTC-6 (Central (CST))
  - Summer (DST): UTC-5 (CDT)
- Area codes: 256 & 938
- GNIS feature ID: 156790

Newberry Crossroads, also known as Bid, is an unincorporated community in Cherokee County, Alabama, United States.

== History ==
The community was named after two men named Newberry, one of whom owned a gin, and the other a store. A post office operated under the name Bid from 1894 to 1904.
