= Broomtown, Alabama =

- Unincorporated community Census-designated place
- Location of Broomtown in Cherokee County, Alabama.
- Coordinates: 34°22′20″N 85°32′12″W
- Country: United States
- State: Alabama
- County: Cherokee

Area
  - Total: 4.70 sq mi (12.16 km^{2})
  - Land: 4.70 sq mi (12.16 km^{2})
  - Water: 0 sq mi (0.00 km^{2})
- Elevation: 719 ft (219 m)

Population (2020)
  - Total: 160
  - Density: 34.1/sq mi (13.16/km^{2})
- Time zone: UTC-6 (Central (CST))
  - Summer (DST): UTC-5 (CDT)
- Area codes: 256 & 938
- GNIS feature ID: 2582666

Broomtown is an unincorporated community and census-designated place in Cherokee County, Alabama, United States. As of the 2020 census, Broomtown had a population of 160.

It was named for Chief Broom (Broomstown) of the Cherokee Nation, whose people occupied the area from the late eighteenth century into the 1830s. The Cherokee had migrated southwest under pressure from European-American encroachment in Tennessee and North Carolina, before Indian Removal from the Southeast on the Trail of Tears to Indian Territory west of the Mississippi River.

Fort Likens, a fort used to house soldiers during the Cherokee removal, was located near Broomtown.

== Demographics ==
Historical population
Census	Pop.	Note	%±
2010	182		—
2020	160		−12.1%
U.S. Decennial Census

Broomtown was first listed as a census designated place in the 2010 U.S. census.

=== 2010 census ===
Broomtown CDP, Alabama – Racial and ethnic composition Note: the US Census treats Hispanic/Latino as an ethnic category. This table excludes Latinos from the racial categories and assigns them to a separate category. Hispanics/Latinos may be of any race.
Race / Ethnicity (NH = Non-Hispanic)	Pop 2010	Pop 2020	% 2010	% 2020
White alone (NH)	179	154	98.35%	96.25%
Black or African American alone (NH)	3	1	1.65%	0.63%
Native American or Alaska Native alone (NH)	0	1	0.00%	0.63%
Asian alone (NH)	0	0	0.00%	0.00%
Native Hawaiian or Pacific Islander alone (NH)	0	0	0.00%	0.00%
Other race alone (NH)	0	0	0.00%	0.00%
Mixed race or Multiracial (NH)	0	2	0.00%	1.25%
Hispanic or Latino (any race)	0	2	0.00%	1.25%
Total	182	160	100.00%	100.00%
