= Sanford Springs, Alabama =

Sanford Springs
- Unincorporated community
- Location in Alabama.
- Coordinates: 34°01′05″N 85°34′24″W
- Country: United States
- State: Alabama
- County: Cherokee
- Elevation: 607 ft (185 m)
- Time zone: UTC-6 (Central (CST))
  - Summer (DST): UTC-5 (CDT)
- Area codes: 256 & 938
- GNIS feature ID: 157016

Sanford Springs is an unincorporated community in Cherokee County, Alabama, United States.

== History ==
The community was given the name of one or more members of the Sanford family.
