= 1988 United States presidential election in Alabama =

- November 8, 1988
- Turnout: 56.20%

Nominee	George H. W. Bush	Michael Dukakis
Party	Republican	Democratic
Home state	Texas	Massachusetts
Running mate	Dan Quayle	Lloyd Bentsen
Electoral vote	9	0
Popular vote	815,576	549,506
Percentage	59.17%	39.86%
County results
Bush
40–50%
50–60%
60–70%
70–80%
Dukakis
40–50%
50–60%
60–70%
70–80%
80–90%
President before election
Ronald Reagan
Republican
Elected President
George H. W. Bush
Republican

The 1988 United States presidential election in Alabama took place on November 8, 1988. All fifty states, and the District of Columbia, were part of the 1988 presidential election. Alabama voters chose nine electors to the Electoral College, which selected the president and vice president. Alabama was won by incumbent United States Vice President George H. W. Bush of Texas, who was running against Massachusetts Governor Michael Dukakis. Bush ran with Indiana Senator Dan Quayle as Vice President, and Dukakis ran with Texas Senator Lloyd Bentsen.

The vast majority of counties in Alabama voted for Bush, with the major exception being the Black Belt, which with its predominantly African-American populace voted overwhelmingly Democratic. Macon County had been the most Democratic in the nation in 1980 and 1984, and it was Dukakis’ sixth-best county in the nation with a margin of over four-to-one for the Massachusetts Governor.

== Campaign ==
=== Primary ===
Al Gore won 64% of the white vote. The racial composition of the Democratic primary was 55% white and 45% black, and 48% of white voters participated in the Republican primary.

=== General ===
John Baker, the chair of the Alabama Democratic Party, criticized the Democratic campaign stating that he didn't "believe that the Dukakis campaign could have run a worse campaign than they've run". Richard Arrington Jr., the mayor of Birmingham and national co-chair of Dukakis' campaign, stated that the campaign gave up on Alabama. In November The Birmingham News reported that Bush had an approval rating of 51% against a disapproval of 26% among Alabama voters while Dukakis held an approval rating of 28% against a disapproval rating of 43%.

Among white voters, 71% supported Bush while 28% supported Dukakis.

The Democrats maintained their control over the Alabama House of Representatives, with 93 seats to the Republican's 12 seats, and Alabama Senate, with 31 seats to the Republican's 4 seats, despite Bush's victory in the presidential race. All five incumbent Democratic members of the United States House of Representatives were reelected.

=== Polling ===
Poll source	Date(s) administered	Sample size	Margin of error	George Bush Republican	Michael Dukakis Democratic	Other / Undecided
The Birmingham News	August 27–31, 1988	502		52%	32%	15%
The Birmingham News	September 27–29, 1988	504		54%	33%	13%
The Birmingham News	November 2–5, 1988	692 (LV)		57%	36%	8%

=== Results ===
1988 United States presidential election in Alabama
Party	Candidate	Votes	Percentage	Electoral votes
Republican	George H. W. Bush	815,576	59.17%	9
Democratic	Michael Dukakis	549,506	39.86%	0
Libertarian	Ron Paul	8,460	0.61%	0
Independent	Lenora Fulani	3,311	0.24%	0
Independent	James Warren	656	0.05%	0
Write-Ins		506	0.04%	0
Independent	Edward Winn	461 (Note: These votes for Winn were not listed by county but only as a state-wide total.)	0.03%	0
Totals		1,378,476	100.0%	9

=== Results by county ===
County	George H.W. Bush Republican		Michael Dukakis Democratic		Ron Paul Libertarian		Leonora Fulani Independent		Various candidates Other parties		Margin		Total votes cast
County	#	%	#	%	#	%	#	%	#	%	#	%	Total votes cast
Autauga	7,828	67.17%	3,667	31.47%	143	1.23%	7	0.06%	9	0.08%	4,161	35.70%	11,654
Baldwin	25,933	72.85%	9,271	26.04%	336	0.94%	21	0.06%	37	0.10%	16,662	46.81%	35,598
Barbour	4,958	55.71%	3,836	43.11%	83	0.93%	11	0.12%	11	0.12%	1,122	12.60%	8,899
Bibb	2,885	56.06%	2,244	43.61%	7	0.14%	2	0.04%	8	0.16%	641	12.45%	5,146
Blount	8,754	64.61%	4,485	33.10%	294	2.17%	5	0.04%	10	0.07%	4,269	31.51%	13,548
Bullock	1,421	31.00%	3,122	68.11%	24	0.52%	8	0.17%	9	0.20%	-1,701	-37.11%	4,584
Butler	3,923	52.59%	3,465	46.45%	61	0.82%	7	0.09%	3	0.04%	458	6.14%	7,459
Calhoun	19,806	58.31%	12,451	36.66%	360	1.06%	1,325	3.90%	26	0.08%	7,355	21.65%	33,968
Chambers	7,694	59.39%	5,103	39.39%	115	0.89%	21	0.16%	23	0.18%	2,591	20.00%	12,956
Cherokee	2,868	47.01%	3,176	52.06%	48	0.79%	1	0.02%	8	0.13%	-308	-5.05%	6,101
Chilton	8,761	69.41%	3,820	30.26%	26	0.21%	12	0.10%	4	0.03%	4,941	39.15%	12,623
Choctaw	3,629	50.89%	3,491	48.96%	5	0.07%	1	0.01%	5	0.07%	138	1.93%	7,131
Clarke	5,708	56.97%	4,217	42.09%	84	0.84%	2	0.02%	9	0.09%	1,491	14.88%	10,020
Clay	3,496	66.74%	1,602	30.58%	45	0.86%	91	1.74%	4	0.08%	1,894	36.16%	5,238
Cleburne	3,071	68.40%	1,383	30.80%	26	0.58%	3	0.07%	7	0.16%	1,688	37.60%	4,490
Coffee	8,890	66.57%	4,319	32.34%	126	0.94%	15	0.11%	5	0.04%	4,571	34.23%	13,355
Colbert	7,775	42.25%	10,397	56.49%	208	1.13%	11	0.06%	13	0.07%	-2,622	-14.24%	18,404
Conecuh	3,256	51.22%	3,022	47.54%	43	0.68%	16	0.25%	20	0.31%	234	3.68%	6,357
Coosa	2,405	56.15%	1,860	43.43%	15	0.35%	2	0.05%	1	0.02%	545	12.72%	4,283
Covington	8,130	67.34%	3,845	31.85%	55	0.46%	30	0.25%	13	0.11%	4,285	35.49%	12,073
Crenshaw	2,617	58.44%	1,836	41.00%	15	0.33%	5	0.11%	5	0.11%	781	17.44%	4,478
Cullman	14,351	61.87%	8,517	36.72%	132	0.57%	176	0.76%	21	0.09%	5,834	25.15%	23,197
Dale	9,266	71.80%	3,476	26.94%	131	1.02%	19	0.15%	13	0.10%	5,790	44.86%	12,905
Dallas	7,630	43.79%	9,660	55.44%	107	0.61%	18	0.10%	8	0.05%	-2,030	-11.65%	17,423
DeKalb	11,478	60.60%	7,333	38.72%	106	0.56%	14	0.07%	9	0.05%	4,145	21.88%	18,940
Elmore	10,852	69.84%	4,501	28.97%	160	1.03%	13	0.08%	13	0.08%	6,351	40.87%	15,539
Escambia	6,807	62.14%	4,020	36.70%	66	0.60%	35	0.32%	26	0.24%	2,787	25.44%	10,954
Etowah	17,828	49.67%	17,762	49.49%	155	0.43%	114	0.32%	32	0.09%	66	0.18%	35,891
Fayette	4,338	57.40%	3,186	42.16%	15	0.20%	6	0.08%	12	0.16%	1,152	15.24%	7,557
Franklin	5,146	50.25%	4,961	48.44%	121	1.18%	8	0.08%	5	0.05%	185	1.81%	10,241
Geneva	5,703	67.32%	2,685	31.69%	45	0.53%	27	0.32%	12	0.14%	3,018	35.63%	8,472
Greene	1,048	23.94%	3,295	75.28%	29	0.66%	3	0.07%	2	0.05%	-2,247	-51.34%	4,377
Hale	2,414	42.71%	3,187	56.39%	35	0.62%	10	0.18%	6	0.11%	-773	-13.68%	5,652
Henry	3,613	61.82%	2,206	37.75%	13	0.22%	6	0.10%	6	0.10%	1,407	24.07%	5,844
Houston	19,989	73.87%	7,001	25.87%	44	0.16%	15	0.06%	12	0.04%	12,988	48.00%	27,061
Jackson	6,090	44.55%	7,418	54.27%	147	1.08%	8	0.06%	6	0.04%	-1,328	-9.72%	13,669
Jefferson	148,879	57.74%	107,766	41.80%	781	0.30%	282	0.11%	73	0.03%	41,113	15.94%	257,833
Lamar	3,214	58.48%	2,274	41.38%	5	0.09%	1	0.02%	2	0.04%	940	17.10%	5,496
Lauderdale	12,942	49.43%	12,862	49.13%	325	1.24%	11	0.04%	88	0.34%	80	0.30%	26,180
Lawrence	3,616	42.96%	4,646	55.20%	83	0.99%	63	0.75%	0	0.00%	-1,030	-12.24%	8,417
Lee	17,180	64.39%	9,078	34.02%	393	1.47%	19	0.07%	19	0.07%	8,102	30.37%	26,683
Limestone	9,086	61.56%	5,455	36.96%	186	1.26%	23	0.16%	14	0.09%	3,631	24.60%	14,760
Lowndes	1,405	29.42%	3,328	69.68%	31	0.65%	7	0.15%	10	0.21%	-1,923	-40.26%	4,776
Macon	1,304	16.81%	6,351	81.88%	40	0.52%	53	0.68%	8	0.10%	-5,047	-65.07%	7,756
Madison	53,575	67.06%	25,800	32.29%	353	0.44%	108	0.14%	58	0.07%	27,775	34.77%	79,894
Marengo	4,241	48.61%	4,402	50.45%	65	0.74%	14	0.16%	3	0.03%	-161	-1.84%	8,725
Marion	5,955	56.73%	4,505	42.92%	17	0.16%	4	0.04%	16	0.15%	1,450	13.81%	10,497
Marshall	12,148	60.90%	7,357	36.88%	264	1.32%	66	0.33%	112	0.56%	4,791	24.02%	19,947
Mobile	72,203	60.88%	45,524	38.39%	766	0.65%	74	0.06%	30	0.03%	26,679	22.49%	118,597
Monroe	5,379	60.07%	3,509	39.19%	45	0.50%	17	0.19%	4	0.04%	1,870	20.88%	8,954
Montgomery	41,131	58.43%	28,709	40.79%	471	0.67%	66	0.09%	14	0.02%	12,422	17.64%	70,391
Morgan	18,679	63.54%	10,594	36.04%	73	0.25%	24	0.08%	27	0.09%	8,085	27.50%	29,397
Perry	2,107	36.59%	3,574	62.07%	52	0.90%	13	0.23%	12	0.21%	-1,467	-25.48%	5,758
Pickens	3,851	55.16%	3,107	44.50%	11	0.16%	4	0.06%	9	0.13%	744	10.66%	6,982
Pike	5,897	60.04%	3,813	38.82%	90	0.92%	7	0.07%	14	0.14%	2,084	21.22%	9,821
Randolph	4,625	64.02%	2,462	34.08%	128	1.77%	1	0.01%	8	0.11%	2,163	29.94%	7,224
Russell	6,333	48.40%	6,589	50.35%	134	1.02%	16	0.12%	14	0.11%	-256	-1.95%	13,086
Shelby	27,052	78.84%	7,138	20.80%	72	0.21%	26	0.08%	26	0.08%	19,914	58.04%	34,314
St. Clair	10,604	70.71%	4,335	28.91%	36	0.24%	8	0.05%	14	0.09%	6,269	41.80%	14,997
Sumter	2,212	33.36%	4,390	66.21%	11	0.17%	7	0.11%	10	0.15%	-2,178	-32.85%	6,630
Talladega	12,973	60.32%	8,291	38.55%	126	0.59%	76	0.35%	40	0.19%	4,682	21.77%	21,506
Tallapoosa	8,502	63.93%	4,598	34.58%	176	1.32%	9	0.07%	13	0.10%	3,904	29.35%	13,298
Tuscaloosa	27,396	59.87%	18,166	39.70%	118	0.26%	46	0.10%	32	0.07%	9,230	20.17%	45,758
Walker	11,011	48.51%	11,338	49.95%	156	0.69%	179	0.79%	16	0.07%	-327	-1.44%	22,700
Washington	3,741	52.23%	3,402	47.49%	8	0.11%	8	0.11%	4	0.06%	339	4.74%	7,163
Wilcox	1,739	33.98%	3,369	65.83%	3	0.06%	2	0.04%	5	0.10%	-1,630	-31.85%	5,118
Winston	6,235	67.59%	2,954	32.02%	16	0.17%	9	0.10%	11	0.12%	3,281	35.57%	9,225
Totals	815,576	59.17%	549,506	39.86%	8,460	0.61%	3,311	0.24%	1,623	0.12%	266,070	19.31%	1,378,476

==== Counties that flipped from Republican to Democratic ====
- Cherokee
- Marengo
- Walker

== See also ==
- Presidency of George H. W. Bush
- United States presidential elections in Alabama

== Works cited ==
- Black, Earl; Black, Merle (1992). The Vital South: How Presidents Are Elected. Harvard University Press. ISBN 0674941306.
- Moreland, Laurence; Steed, Robert; Baker, Tod, eds. (1991). The 1988 Presidential Election in the South: Continuity Amidst Change in Southern Party Politics. Praeger Publishers. ISBN 0275931455.
