= Biei =

Biei 美瑛町
- Town
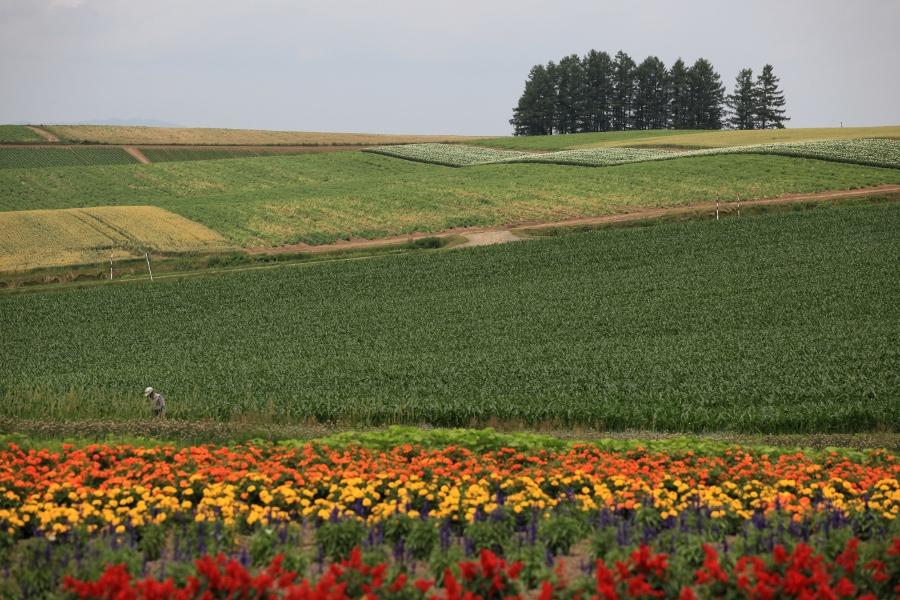

- Flag Emblem

- Location of Biei in Hokkaido (Kamikawa Subprefecture)

- Location in Japan
- Coordinates: 43°35′N 142°28′E
- Country: Japan
- Region: Hokkaido
- Prefecture: Hokkaido (Kamikawa Subprefecture)
- District: Kamikawa (Ishikari)

Government
  - Mayor: Satoshi Hamada

Area
  - Total: 677.16 km^{2} (261.45 sq mi)

Population (May 2024)
  - Total: 9,343
  - Density: 13.80/km^{2} (35.73/sq mi)
- Time zone: UTC+09:00 (JST)
- City hall address: 4-6-1 Motomachi, Biei-chō, Kamikawa-gun, Hokkaidō; 071-0292
- Website: www.town.biei.hokkaido.jp
- Symbols
- Flower: Lily of the Valley
- Tree: Japanese White Birch

Biei (美瑛町, Biei-chō) is a town located in Kamikawa Subprefecture, Hokkaido, Japan. As of May 2024, the town has an estimated population of 9,343, and a density of 14 persons per km^{2}. The total area is 677.16 km^{2}.

== Overview ==
Biei is famous for its views of wide fields and hills, and is used as a backdrop for many Japanese commercials and TV programmes. The bright colours of its fields attract thousands of visitors in July and August.

The town also houses the Shinzo Maeda Photo Art Gallery.

Since 1992, Biei has held the "Biei Healthy Marathon", which attracts runners from all around Japan.

== Geography ==
Biei is located between the cities of Asahikawa and Furano, below the Tokachidake mountain range in northern Hokkaido. The sloping hills of Biei are the product of pyroclastic plateaus, which are the results of ash from volcanic eruptions. Biei has 676.78 km^{2} of land, of which 70% is used for forestry and 15% is used for agriculture.

== History ==
After the establishment of Hebetto, now Asahi, in 1894, Biei village separated from Kaguru village in 1900. Biei Town was established in 1940 and the Agricultural cooperative model was implemented in 1947. In 1950, hot springs were discovered and the Tourist Association was established the following year of 1951.

Mt. Tokachi had five eruptions, the first one recorded in the Edo period, which led to the establishment of measures in preparation for natural emergencies in Biei, which includes emergency response training by residents and organisations.

== Demographics ==
As of May 2024, Biei's population stands at 9,343. The largest 5-year age cohort is the 70-74 year old group, with a total of 812 people, followed by the 50-54 year old group with 700 people. Nearly 40 percent of the population is age 65 or older.

Historical population
Year	Pop.	±%
1970	18,002	—
1980	14,826	−17.6%
1990	12,769	−13.9%
2000	11,902	−6.8%
2010	10,956	−7.9%
2020	9,668	−11.8%

== Education ==
The Biei Town Board of Education Administration Division runs the schools, which include 5 elementary schools, 2 junior high schools and 1 high school.

== Government ==
Biei is governed by a mayor and the a town council. The members in the council are elected every four years. There are 14 members as of 2024 until 30 April 2027.

== Economy ==
The core industry in Biei is agriculture and tourism.

=== Agriculture ===
Japanese Agriculture (JA) Biei, an entrepreneurial co-operative consists of 741 members and is a part of the Japanese Agriculture Co-operative. The main agricultural production was rice until 1983 when potatoes, beets, beans, wheat and other seasonal crops were introduced and cultivated in cycles. Biei is providing direct payment subsidies to have sustainable development in the agricultural sector and stimulate the interest in farming.

=== Tourism ===
The discovery of Shirogane Onsen hot springs in 1950 started Biei tourism and established the brand of the town as "Biei, the Town of Hills." The hot springs were drilled out from 399m deep in the ground and are measured to be 48 °C. Festivals such as "Dokanto Agriculture Festivals," "Biei Encounter Festivals," and "Nachi Biei Fire Festival" are hosted to increase tourism, which is a collaboration by the residents and local organisations.

As of 2018, there were over 2.2 million tourists visiting Biei which increased incidents of trespassing into farms and causing trampling of crops. There are reports of illegal drones flying over private land as well as discussions regarding potential transfer of outside species introduced into the crops through trespassing tourists.

The Biei council established the Biei Town Tourism Master Plan in 2020 that aims to improve the behaviour of visitors and improve Biei tourism

=== Local attractions ===
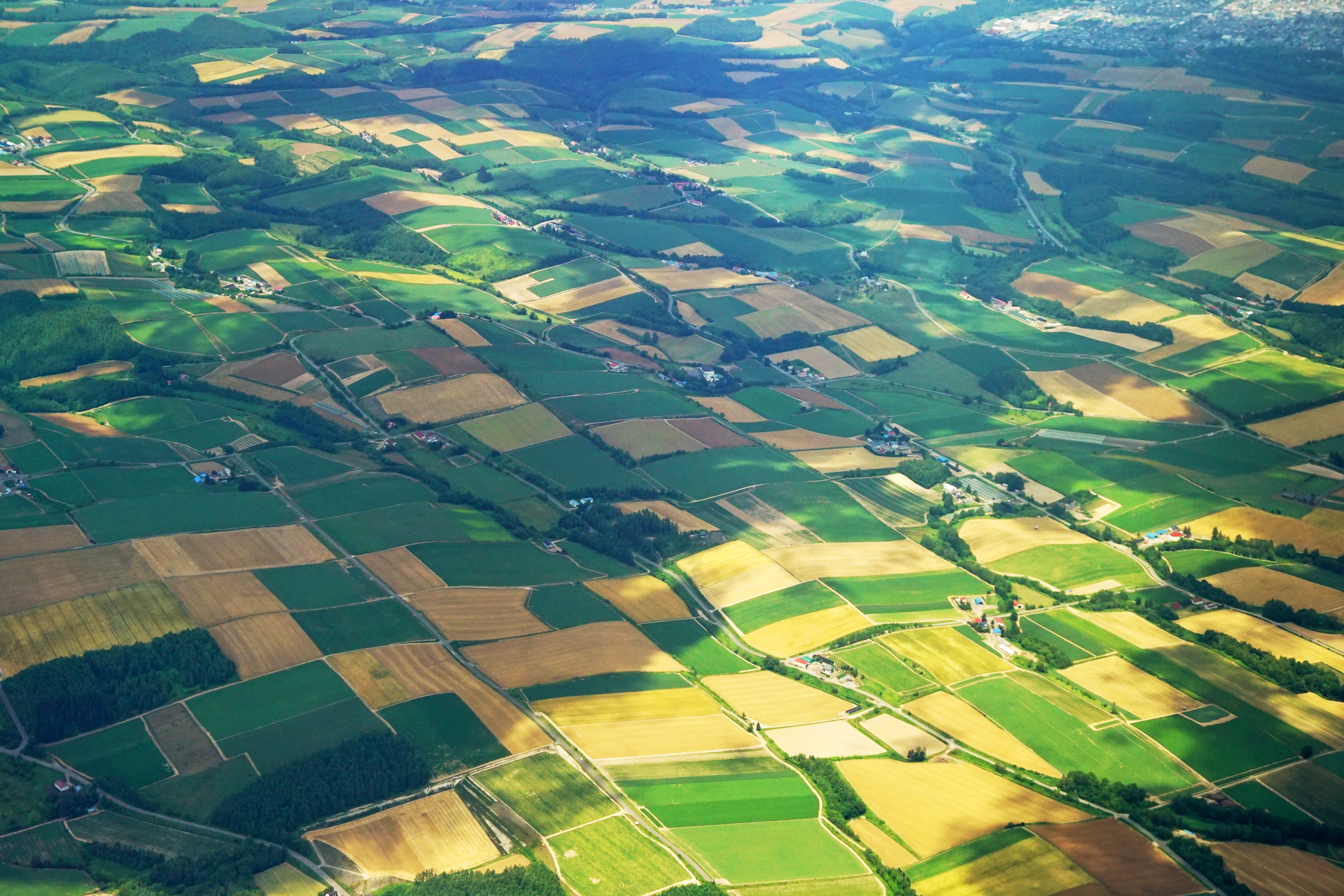
Patchwork Road

==== Patchwork Road ====
Patchwork Road, named after the pattern of the field from aerial perspective, is located in the northwest of the town centre. It is known for the green colour in the summer and the white from the layer of snow during winter. The field consists of trees specifically known for the image used in commercials: Mild Seven Hill, Ken and Mary Tree, Seven Star Tree, as well as Parents and Child Tree which consists of oaks. Hokusei Hill Observatory is also located within the area, which is known for its pyramid-shaped form, next to the flower park called Zerubu Hill.

==== Panorama Road ====
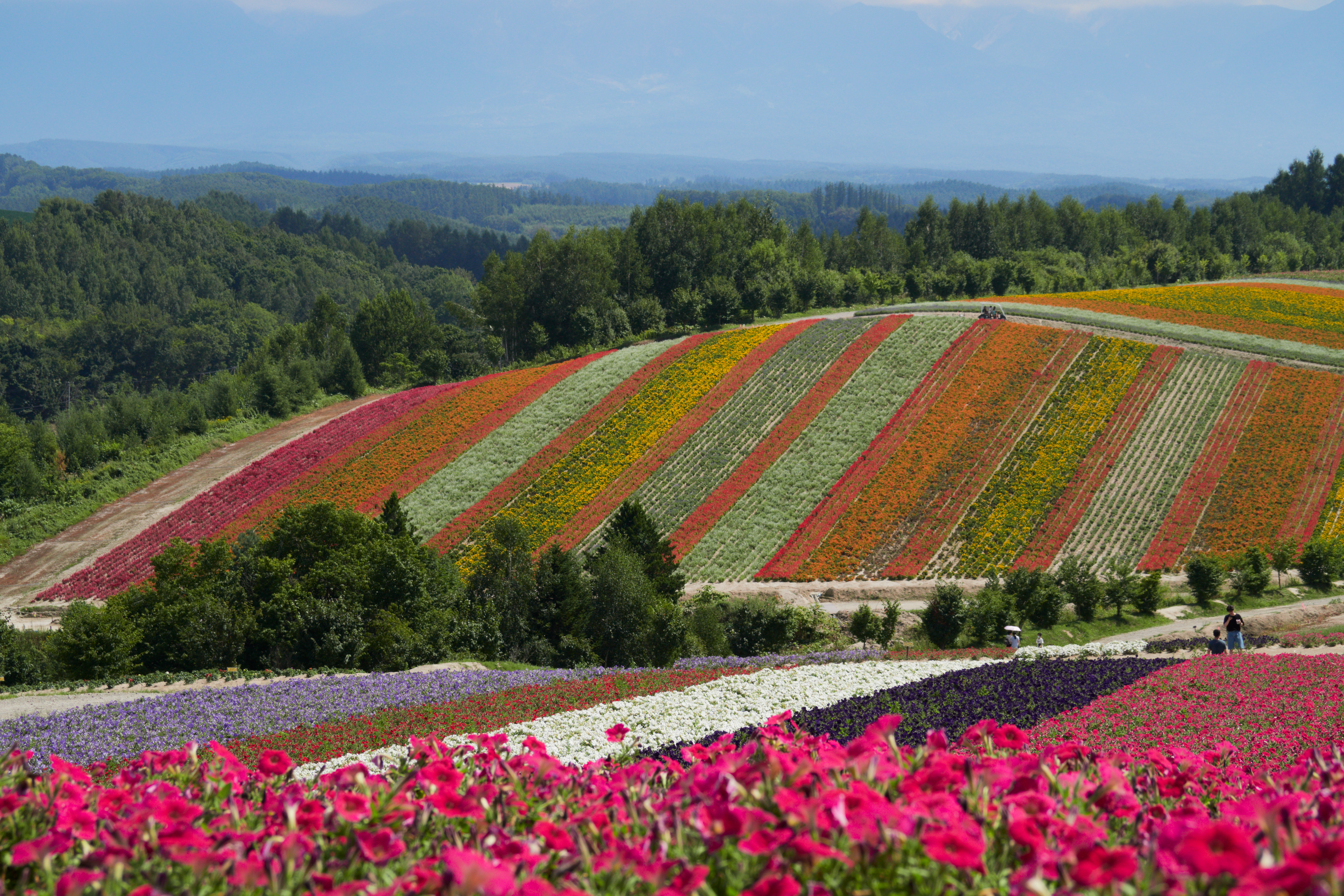
Shikisai-no-oka in summer

Panorama Road consists of fields that are explored with vehicles such as cars or bicycles. The field includes Shikisai Hill, a flower park known for its lavender and other flowers and its trail within it; and Kanno Farm, which is a park located next to the main road between Biei and Furano.

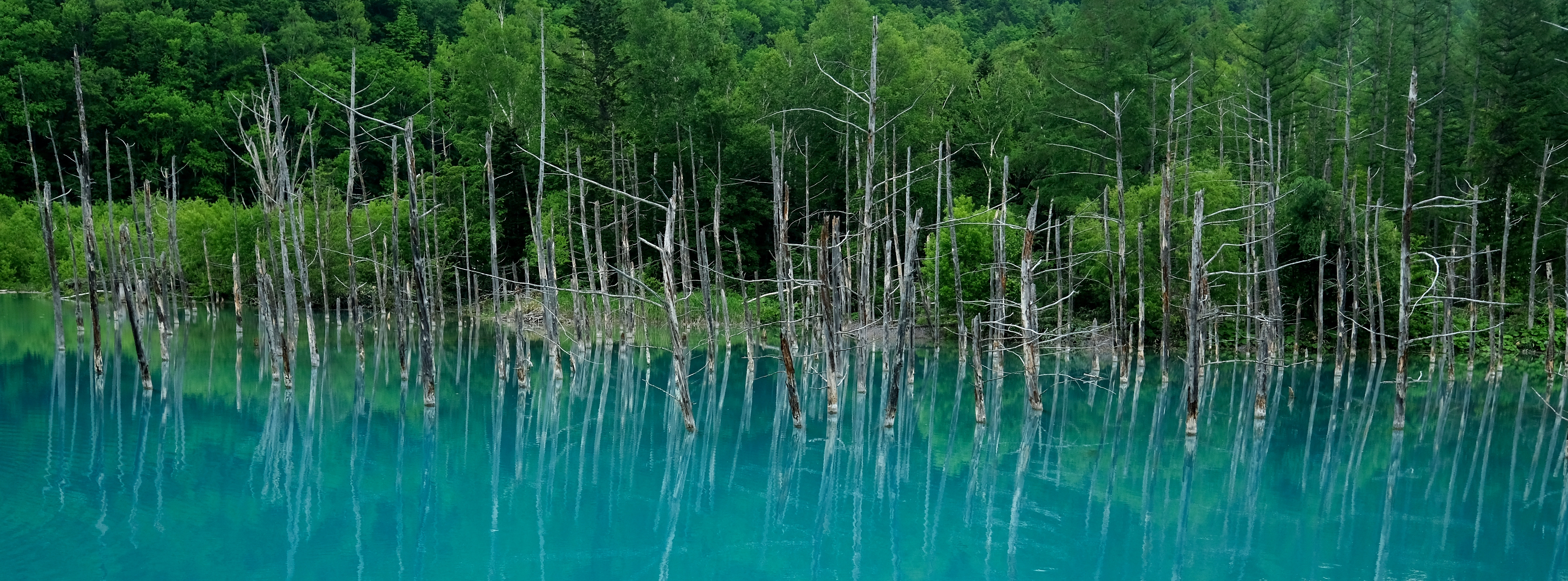
Shirogane Blue Pond

==== Shirogane Blue Pond ====
Shirogane Blue Pond is known for its colour of the water and the Japanese larch trees that surround the area. The colour of the pond was the result of the aluminium added into the water to control the mudslides.

==== Museum ====
The Misora Hillside Local history Museum focuses on local history and astronomy. It has "Bichu" the observatory, which holds a 400mm reflecting telescope, 150mm refracting telescope, and a telescope for solar surface observation.

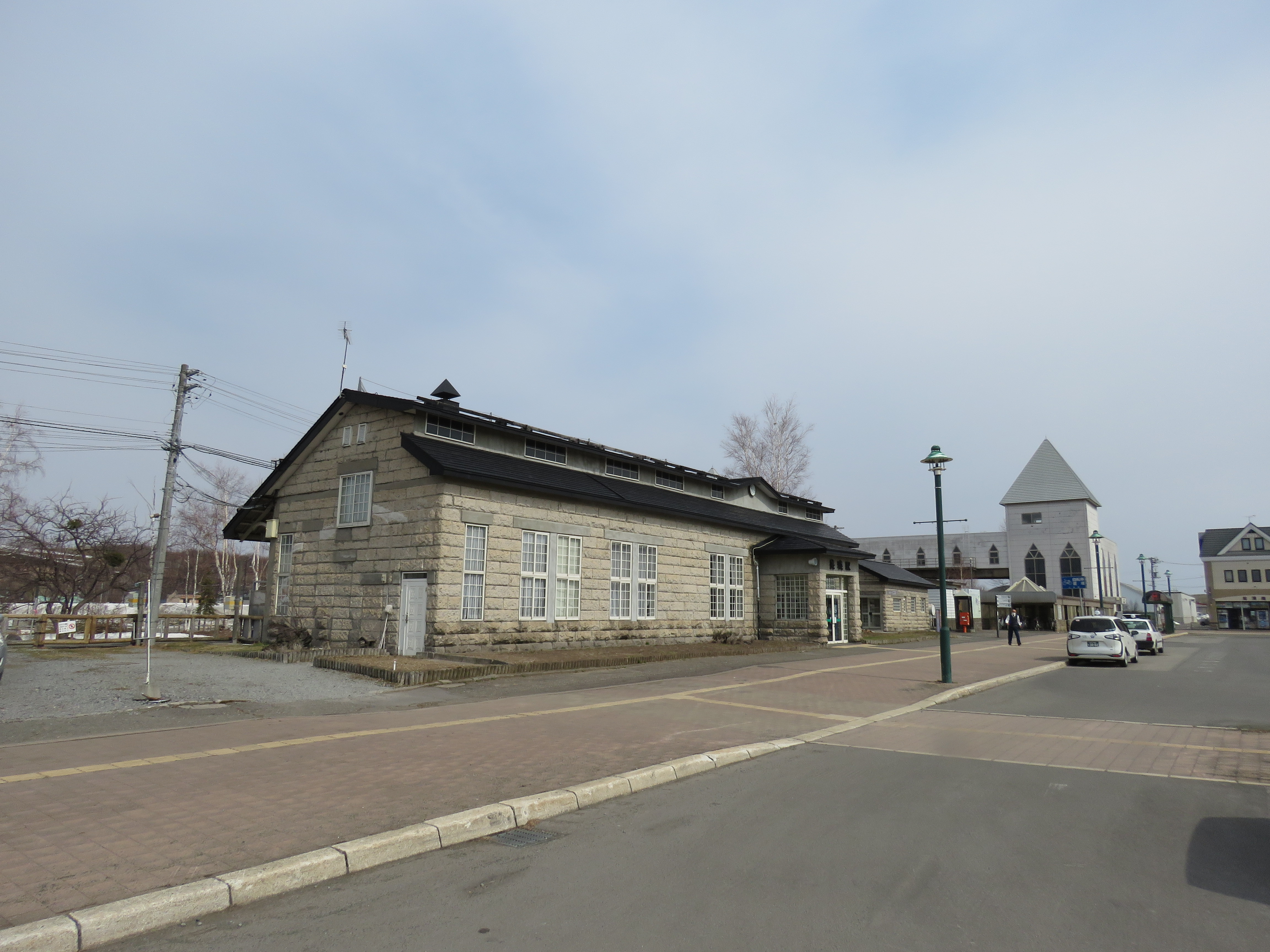
Biei Station

== Transportation ==
The main access to Beiei is by train, bus, and car through Asahikawa and Furano, or by plane from Asahikawa. There is also a train from Sapporo Station to Asahikawa Station.

== Climate ==
Climate data for Biei, Hokkaido, elevation 250 m (820 ft), (1991−2020 normals, extremes 1977−present)
Month	Jan	Feb	Mar	Apr	May	Jun	Jul	Aug	Sep	Oct	Nov	Dec	Year
Record high °C (°F)	6.0 (42.8)	11.4 (52.5)	14.9 (58.8)	27.0 (80.6)	34.4 (93.9)	36.0 (96.8)	36.1 (97.0)	37.1 (98.8)	32.7 (90.9)	25.7 (78.3)	20.2 (68.4)	12.1 (53.8)	37.1 (98.8)
Mean daily maximum °C (°F)	−3.9 (25.0)	−2.6 (27.3)	2.0 (35.6)	10.2 (50.4)	18.0 (64.4)	22.3 (72.1)	25.7 (78.3)	25.8 (78.4)	21.3 (70.3)	14.2 (57.6)	5.6 (42.1)	−1.6 (29.1)	11.4 (52.6)
Daily mean °C (°F)	−8.7 (16.3)	−7.9 (17.8)	−3.0 (26.6)	4.4 (39.9)	11.3 (52.3)	15.9 (60.6)	19.7 (67.5)	20.0 (68.0)	15.2 (59.4)	8.3 (46.9)	1.5 (34.7)	−5.5 (22.1)	5.9 (42.7)
Mean daily minimum °C (°F)	−14.8 (5.4)	−14.7 (5.5)	−9.1 (15.6)	−1.3 (29.7)	4.7 (40.5)	10.0 (50.0)	14.7 (58.5)	15.2 (59.4)	9.8 (49.6)	3.0 (37.4)	−2.9 (26.8)	−10.8 (12.6)	0.3 (32.6)
Record low °C (°F)	−33.2 (−27.8)	−32.7 (−26.9)	−27.5 (−17.5)	−14.2 (6.4)	−4.7 (23.5)	−0.9 (30.4)	3.8 (38.8)	4.7 (40.5)	−0.6 (30.9)	−6.0 (21.2)	−20.8 (−5.4)	−27.3 (−17.1)	−33.2 (−27.8)
Average precipitation mm (inches)	41.1 (1.62)	38.3 (1.51)	47.0 (1.85)	49.5 (1.95)	68.5 (2.70)	69.5 (2.74)	121.2 (4.77)	168.3 (6.63)	129.0 (5.08)	96.0 (3.78)	94.5 (3.72)	73.5 (2.89)	996.4 (39.24)
Average snowfall cm (inches)	164 (65)	141 (56)	129 (51)	28 (11)	0 (0)	0 (0)	0 (0)	0 (0)	0 (0)	3 (1.2)	79 (31)	182 (72)	726 (287.2)
Average extreme snow depth cm (inches)	65 (26)	78 (31)	76 (30)	32 (13)	0 (0)	0 (0)	0 (0)	0 (0)	0 (0)	2 (0.8)	23 (9.1)	48 (19)	81 (32)
Average precipitation days (≥ 1.0 mm)	15.2	13.1	13.6	11.4	11.0	9.9	10.9	11.7	12.3	14.1	17.9	18.2	159.3
Average snowy days (≥ 3.0 cm)	21.1	18.8	17.0	3.3	0	0	0	0	0	0.4	8.2	21.1	89.9
Mean monthly sunshine hours	67.5	83.2	122.1	154.0	181.5	166.0	161.6	156.2	149.8	123.4	60.1	47.9	1,473.3
Source 1: JMA
Source 2: JMA

== Gallery ==
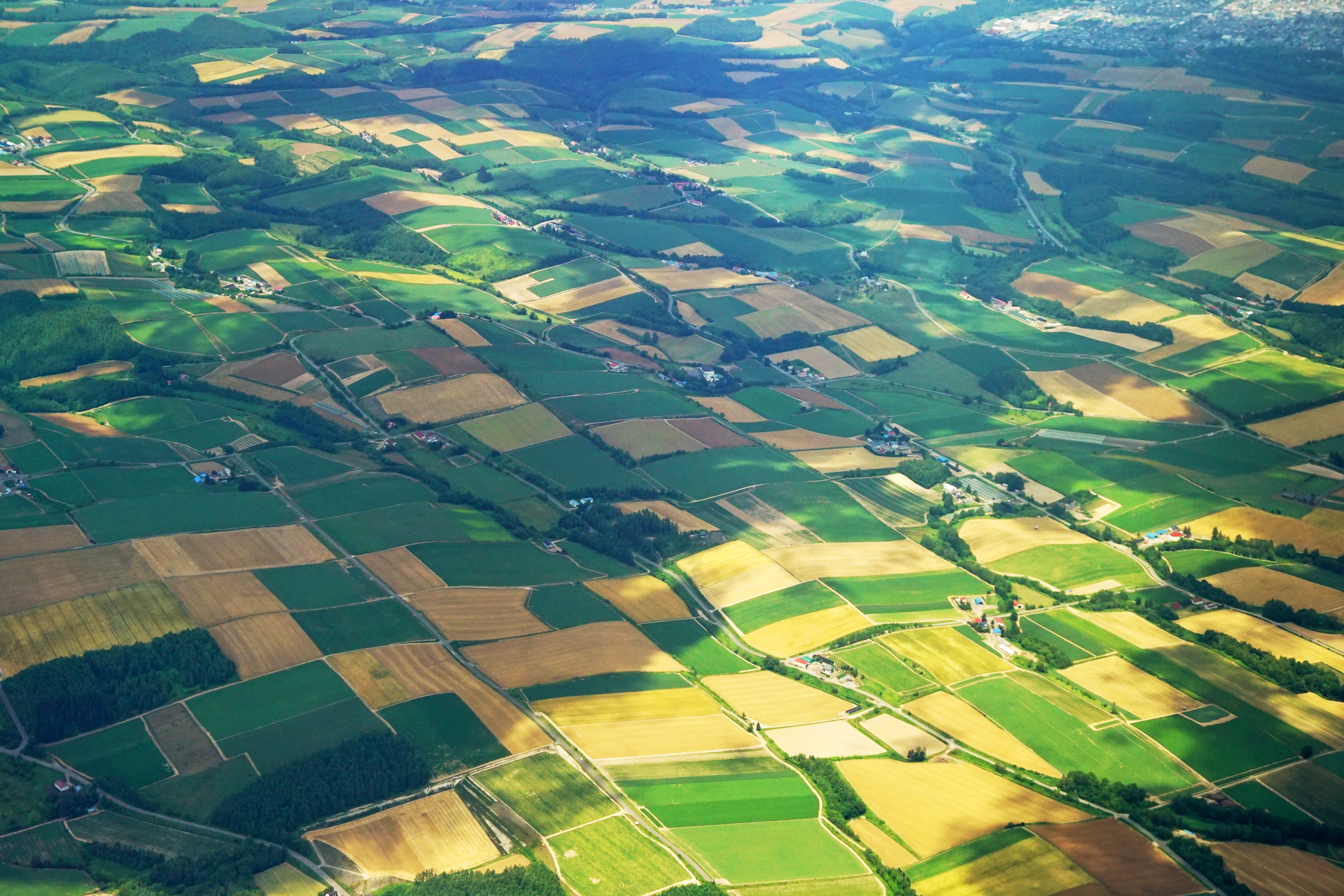
The Patchwork Road

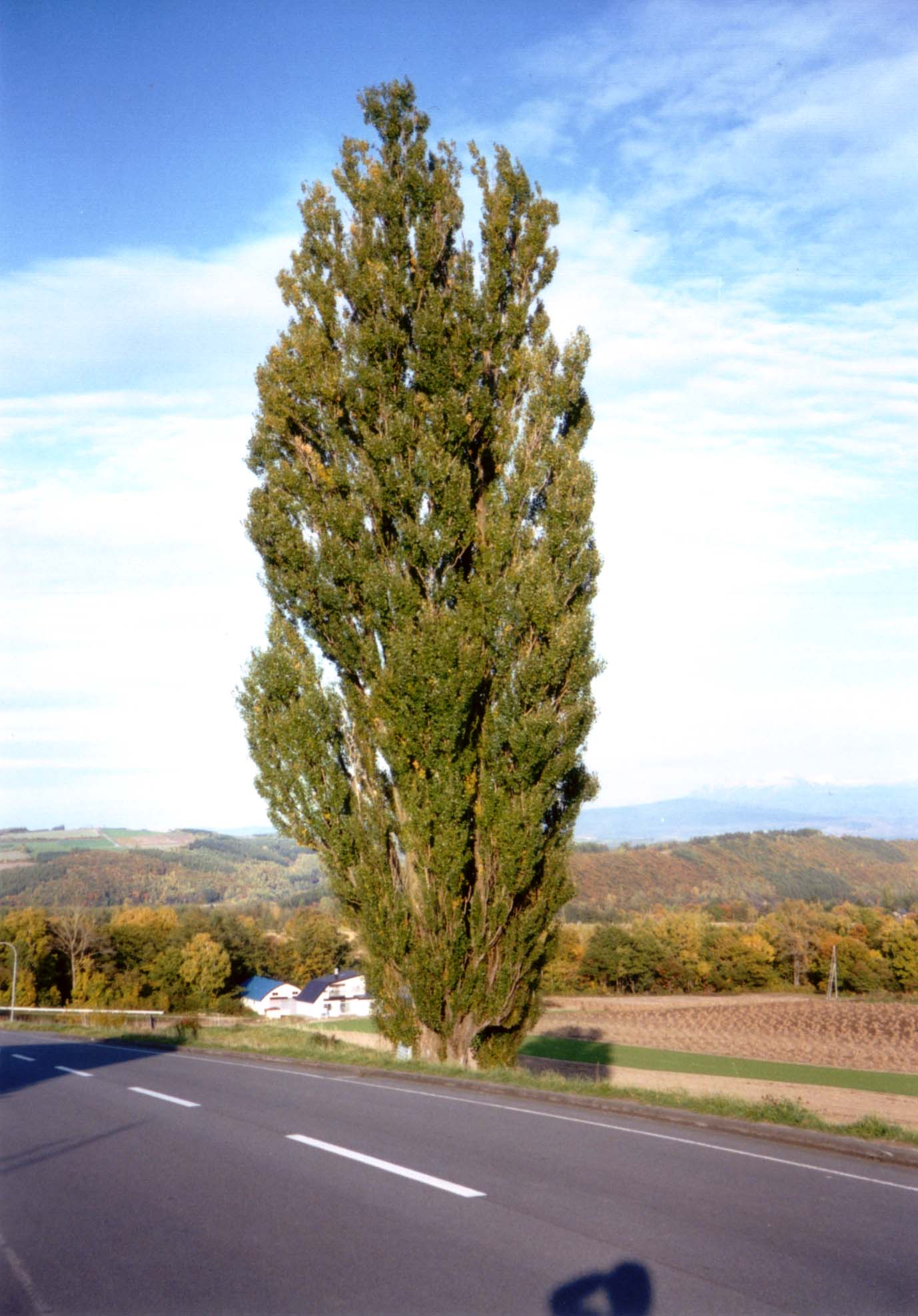
Tree of "Ken and Merry"

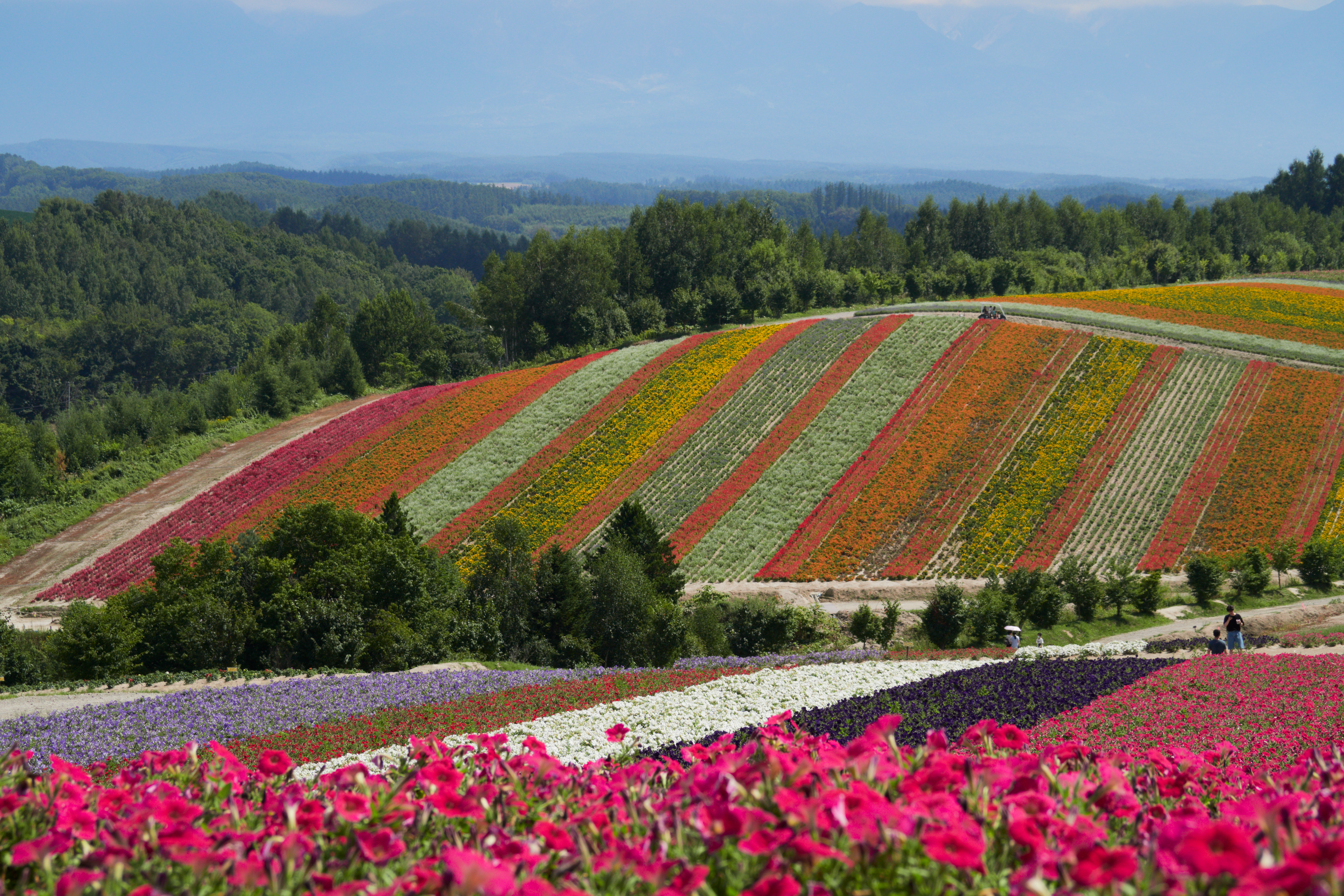
Shikisai-no-oka in summer

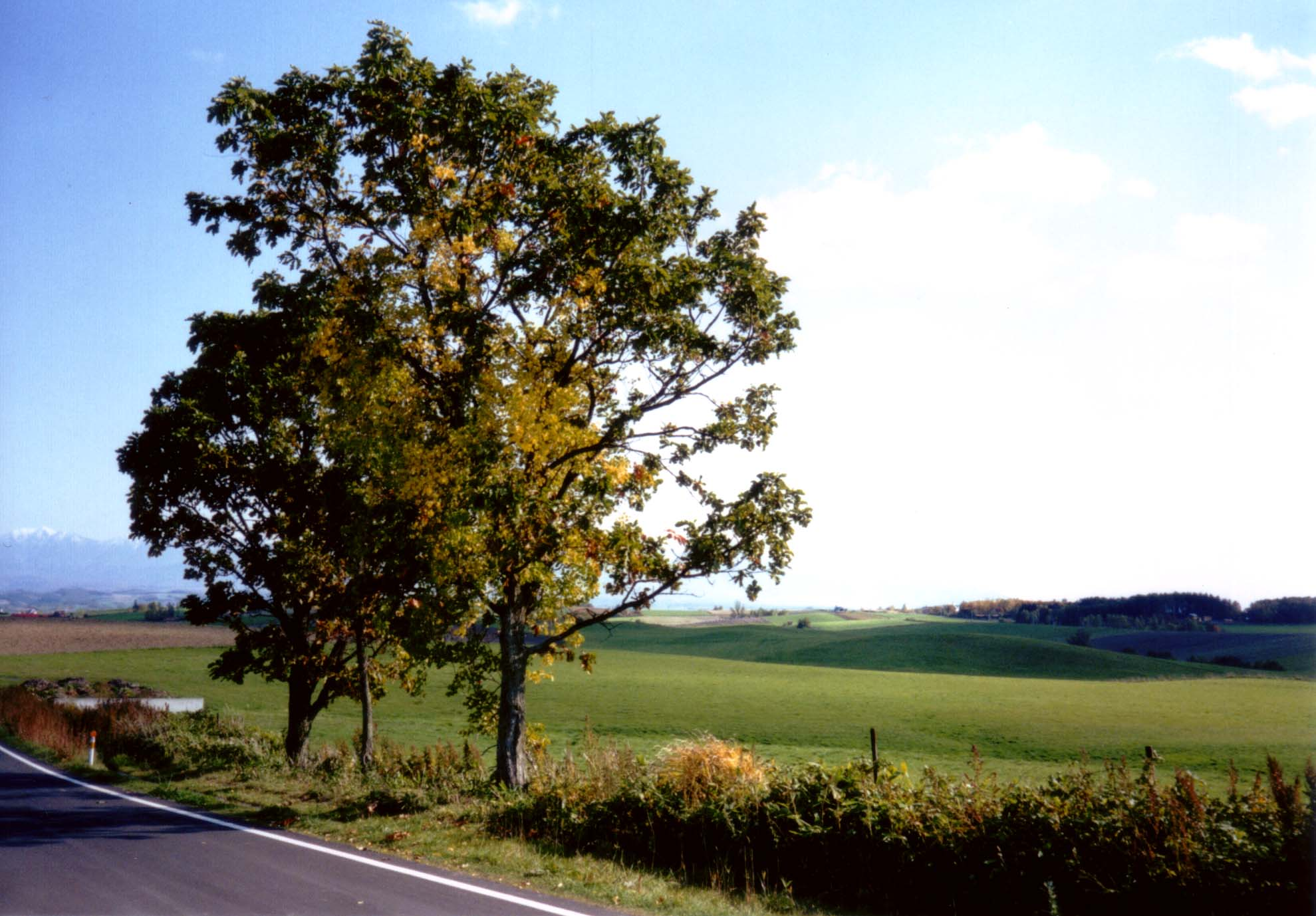
Tree of a parent and a child

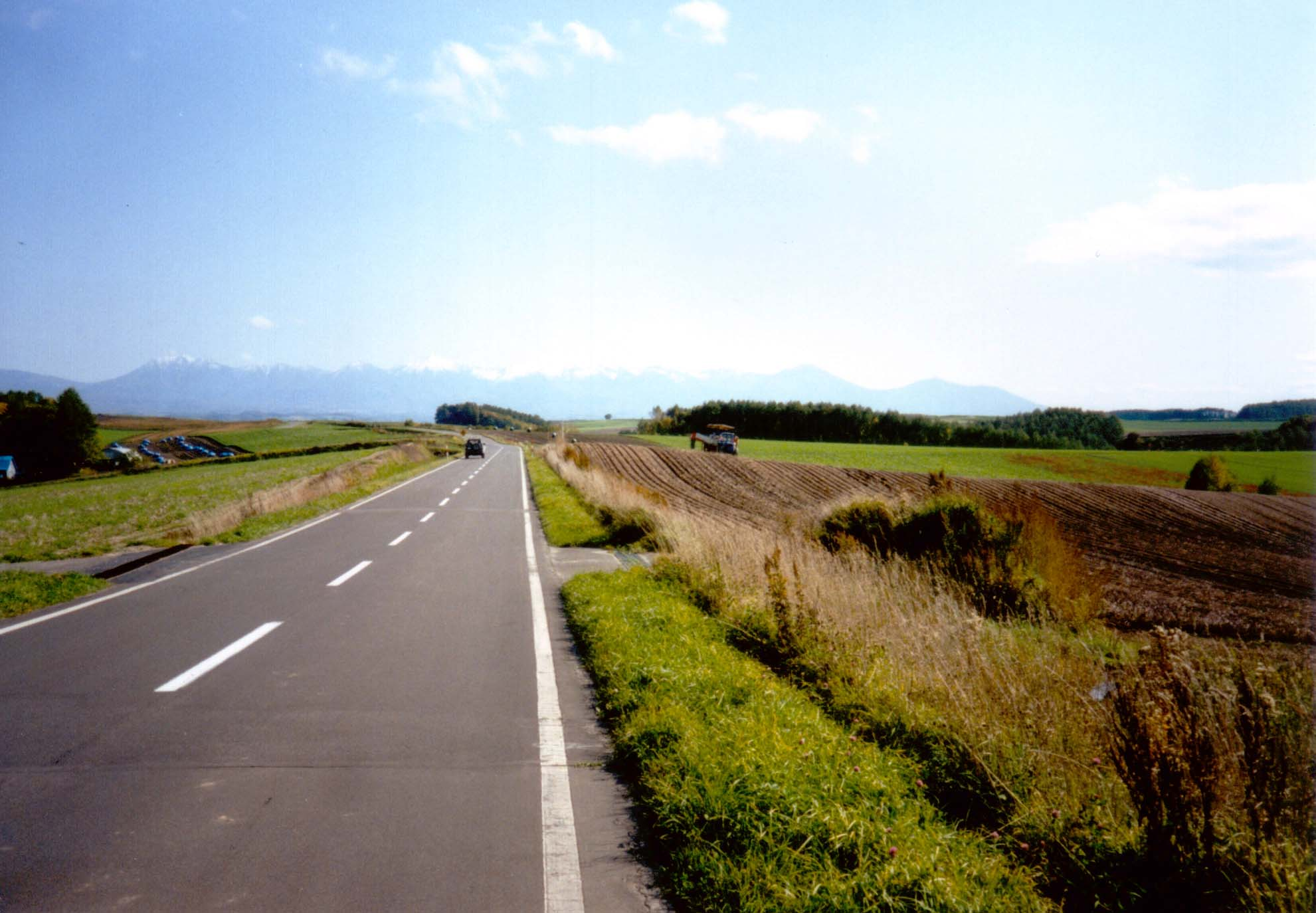

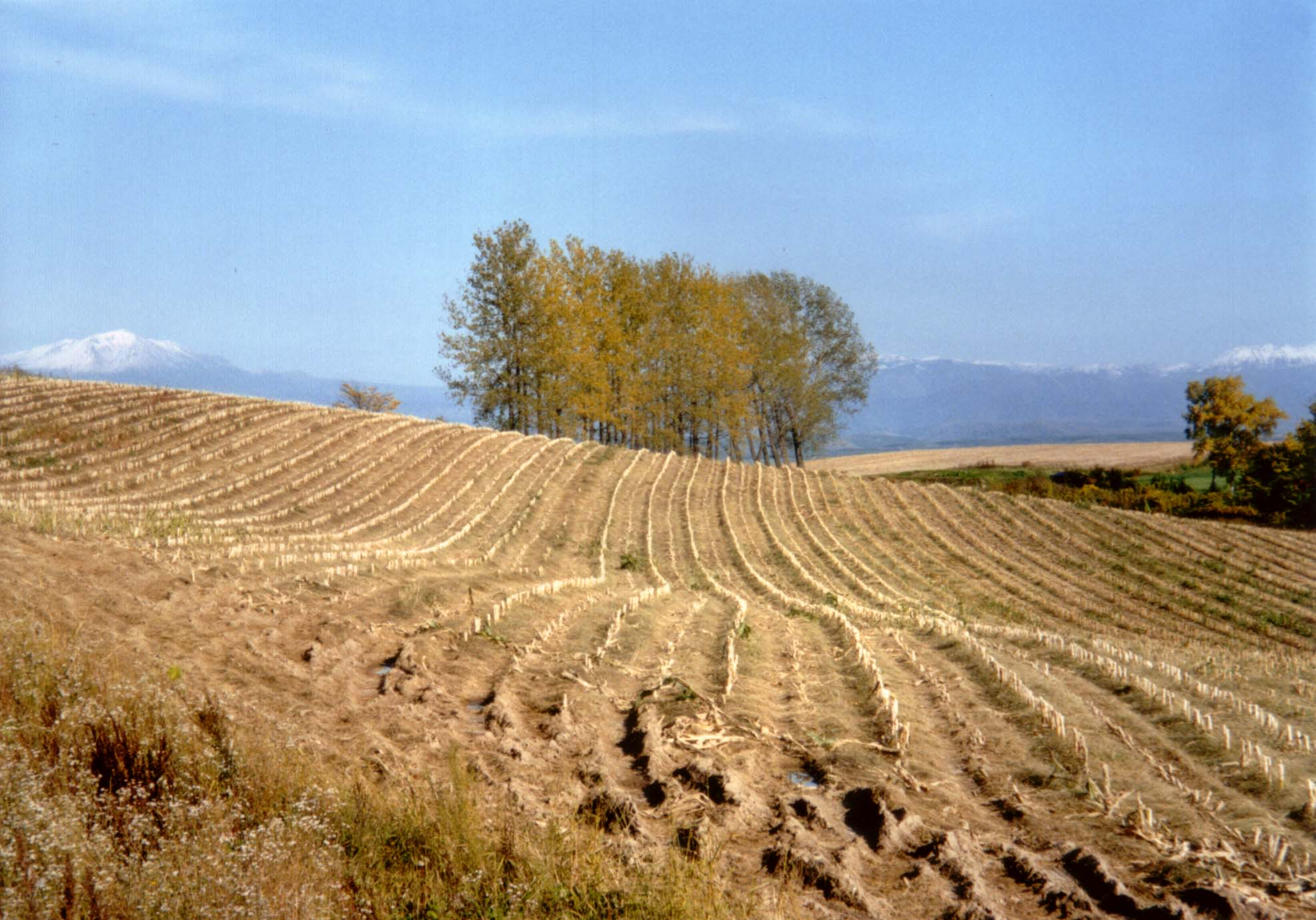

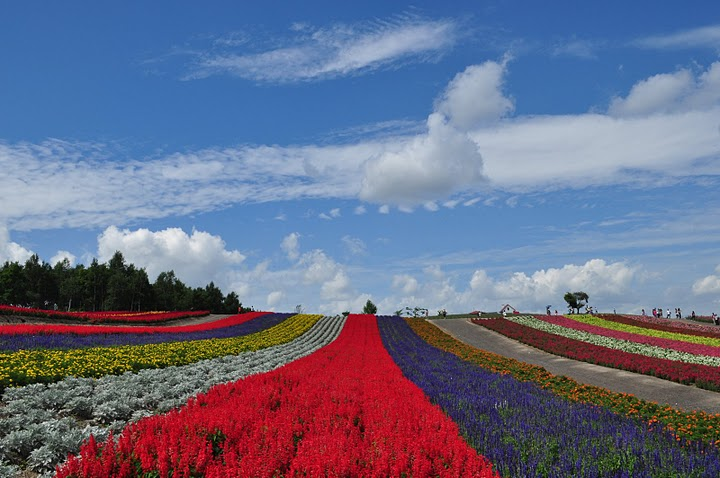

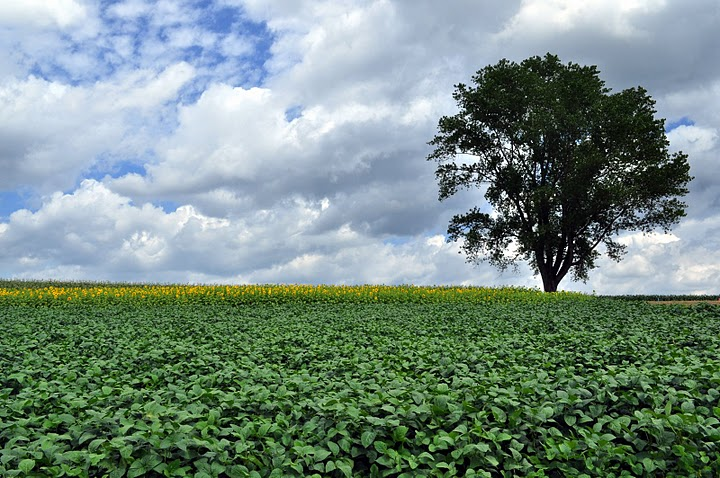
Tree of philosophy

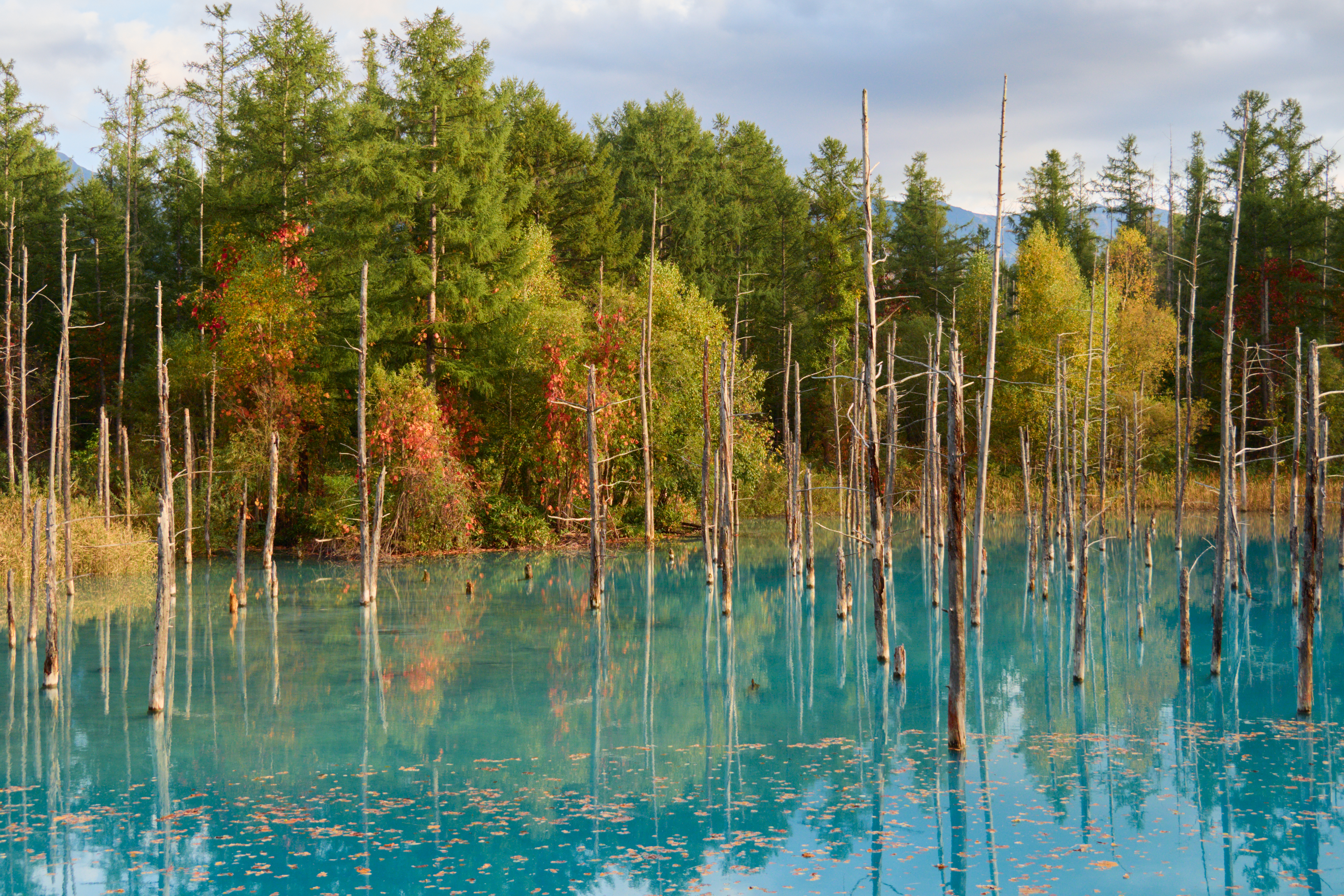
Shirogane Blue Pond in autumn

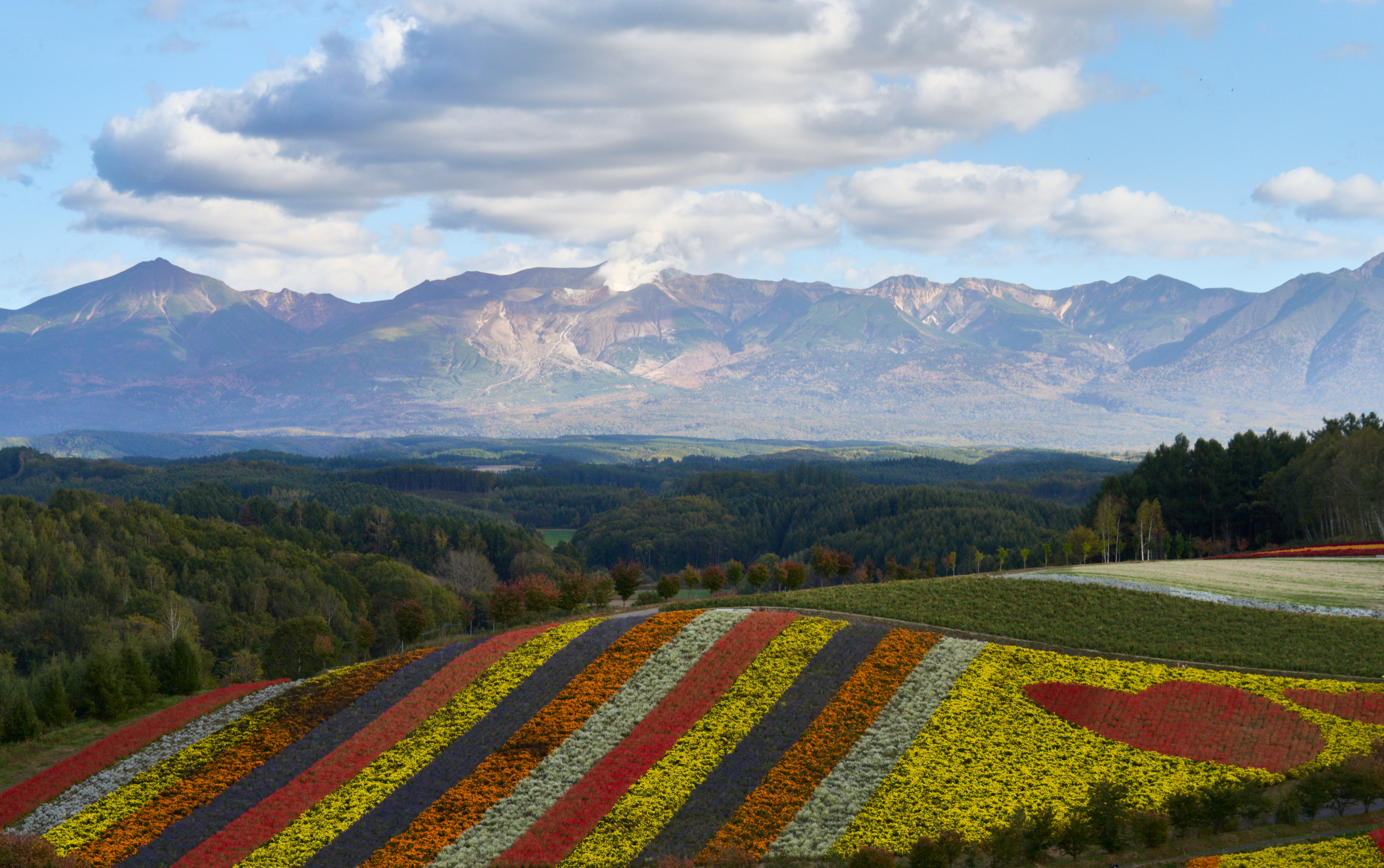

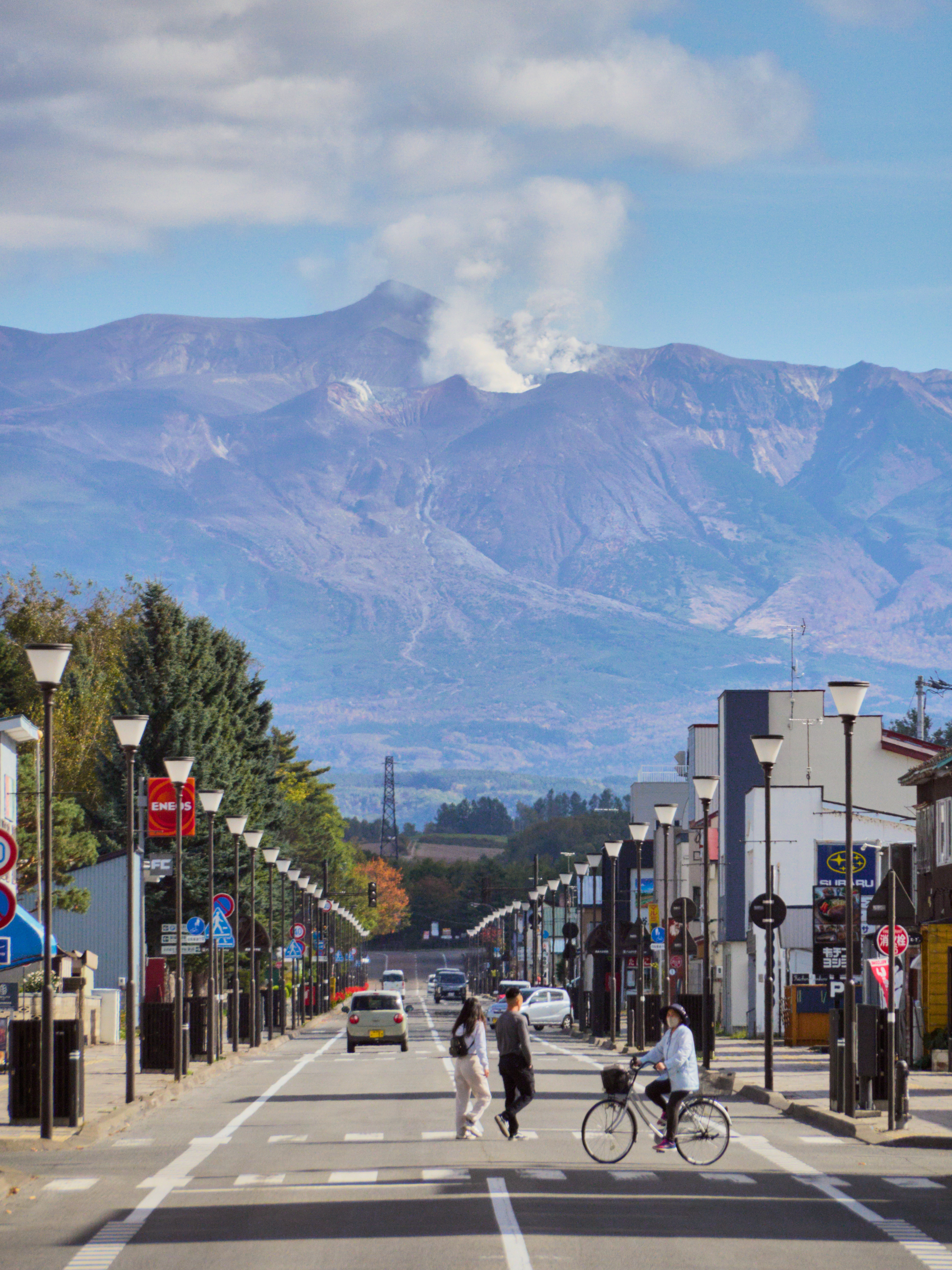

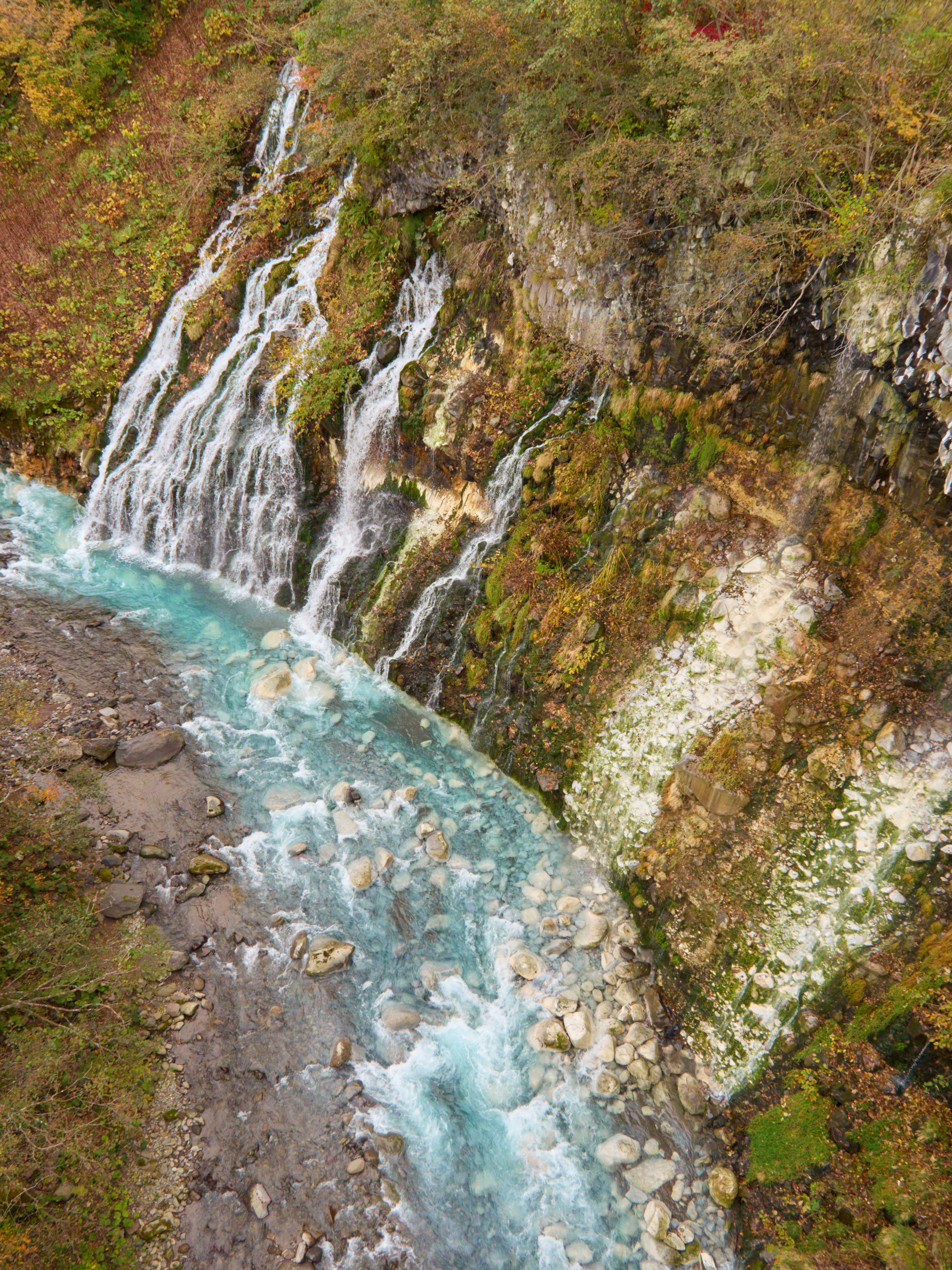
Shirahige falls
