= McCord Crossroads, Alabama =

McCord Crossroads
- Unincorporated community
- Location in Alabama.
- Coordinates: 34°06′59″N 85°27′35″W
- Country: United States
- State: Alabama
- County: Cherokee
- Elevation: 640 ft (200 m)
- Time zone: UTC-6 (Central (CST))
  - Summer (DST): UTC-5 (CDT)
- Area codes: 256 & 938
- GNIS feature ID: 152269

McCords Crossroads (formerly, Hopewell) is an unincorporated community in Cherokee County, Alabama, United States. It lies at an elevation of 640 feet (195 m).

== History ==
McCord Crossroads was named in honor of James McCord.
