= McGhee, Alabama =

McGhee
- Unincorporated community
- Location in Alabama.
- Coordinates: 34°10′04″N 85°43′57″W
- Country: United States
- State: Alabama
- County: Cherokee
- Elevation: 561 ft (171 m)
- Time zone: UTC-6 (Central (CST))
  - Summer (DST): UTC-5 (CDT)
- Area codes: 256 & 938
- GNIS feature ID: 122549

McGhee is an unincorporated community in Cherokee County, Alabama, United States.

== History ==
A post office called McGhee was established in 1897, and remained in operation until it was discontinued in 1903. The community was named for a local family of settlers.
