= Bluffton, Alabama =

Bluffton
- Unincorporated community
- Location in Alabama.
- Coordinates: 34°00′25″N 85°26′24″W
- Country: United States
- State: Alabama
- County: Cherokee
- Elevation: 850 ft (260 m)
- Time zone: UTC-6 (Central (CST))
  - Summer (DST): UTC-5 (CDT)
- Area codes: 256 & 938
- GNIS feature ID: 156087

Bluffton is an unincorporated community in Cherokee County, Alabama, United States.

== History ==
Bluffton was founded as a mining community in 1888. In 1890, Bluffton was home to approximately 8,000 residents. The Bluffton Land, Ore and Furnace Company operated an iron mine in the area, and was also responsible for building the Signal Hotel, which at one point hosted Rudyard Kipling. The Signal Hotel was the first structure in Cherokee County with electric lights. Bluffton had one newspaper, the Bluffton Mascot, and was home to a Methodist Episcopal church and Salem Baptist Church, which is still in use today. Bluffton was also the planned site of a college, The University of the Southland. A groundbreaking took place on April 24, 1889, but the college was never built. Besides the iron mines, Bluffton was home to a water works system, school, post office, and Cherokee County's first electrical generating plant. Even so, Bluffton's ore fields did not meet the expectations of their investors and higher grade iron was available closer to Birmingham. Commercial businesses began to fail, and Bluffton soon came to be considered a ghost town.

A post office was operated in Bluffton from 1888 to 1934.
