= Ellisville, Alabama =

Ellisville
- Unincorporated community
- Location in Alabama.
- Coordinates: 34°03′53″N 85°36′36″W
- Country: United States
- State: Alabama
- County: Cherokee
- Elevation: 581 ft (177 m)
- Time zone: UTC-6 (Central (CST))
  - Summer (DST): UTC-5 (CDT)
- Area codes: 256 & 938
- GNIS feature ID: 117952

Ellisville, also known as Coloma, is an unincorporated community in Cherokee County, Alabama, United States.

== History ==
Ellisville was named for Wyatt Ellis Sr. who kept a store in the community. A post office operated under the name Coloma from 1850 to 1907. Company I of the 19th Regiment Alabama Infantry, known as the "Cherokee Rangers", mustered at Coloma on August 10, 1861.
