= Shinzo Maeda =

Japanese photographer

Shinzo Maeda (前田真三, Maeda Shinzō; 1922–1998) was a Japanese photographer famous for landscape photographs and movies.

He published 46 photography books in Japan, and founded the Tankei Photo Agency Co. The Shinzo Maeda Photo Art Gallery in Biei, Hokkaidō, opened in 1987, and exhibits a number of his Hokkaidō photographs.

One of his movies, Tower on the Hill of Japan's Biei region, is often shown in HDTV format.
