= McFrey Crossroads, Alabama =

McFrey Crossroads
- Unincorporated community
- Location in Alabama.
- Coordinates: 33°58′34″N 85°34′30″W
- Country: United States
- State: Alabama
- County: Cherokee
- Elevation: 702 ft (214 m)
- Time zone: UTC-6 (Central (CST))
  - Summer (DST): UTC-5 (CDT)
- Area codes: 256 & 938
- GNIS feature ID: 160073

McFrey Crossroads is an unincorporated community in Cherokee County, Alabama, United States.

== History ==
McFrey Crossroads was named in honor of Walter McFry.
