= Key, Alabama =

Key
- Unincorporated community
- Location in Alabama.
- Coordinates: 34°06′09″N 85°32′04″W
- Country: United States
- State: Alabama
- County: Cherokee
- Elevation: 640 ft (200 m)
- Time zone: UTC-6 (Central (CST))
  - Summer (DST): UTC-5 (CDT)
- Area codes: 256 & 938
- GNIS feature ID: 121167

Key is an unincorporated community in Cherokee County, Alabama, United States.

== History ==
A post office called Key was established in 1880, and remained in operation until it was discontinued in 1936. The name comes from Lockey, a family of settlers.
