= Hurley, Alabama =

Hurley
- Unincorporated community
- Location in Alabama.
- Coordinates: 34°16′30″N 85°37′23″W
- Country: United States
- State: Alabama
- County: Cherokee
- Elevation: 568 ft (173 m)
- Time zone: UTC-6 (Central (CST))
  - Summer (DST): UTC-5 (CDT)
- Area codes: 256 & 938
- GNIS feature ID: 156509

Hurley is an unincorporated community in Cherokee County, Alabama, United States.

== History ==
A post office called Hurley was established in 1882, and remained in operation until it was discontinued in 1906. The community was named for Edmund Hurley, an early resident.
