= 180th Ohio Infantry Regiment =

- Active: September 1864 to July 12, 1865
- Country: United States
- Allegiance: Union
- Branch: Infantry
- Engagements: Carolinas campaign Battle of Wyse Fork

The 180th Ohio Infantry Regiment, sometimes 180th Ohio Volunteer Infantry (or 180th OVI) was an infantry regiment in the Union Army during the American Civil War.

== Service ==
The 180th Ohio Infantry was organized at Camp Chase in Columbus, Ohio September through October 1864 and mustered in for one year service under the command of Colonel Willard Warner.

The regiment was attached to 3rd Brigade, Defenses of Nashville & Chattanooga Railroad, Department of the Cumberland, to January 1865. 1st Brigade, 1st Division, XXIII Army Corps, Army of the Ohio, and Department of North Carolina, to July 1865.

The 180th Ohio Infantry mustered out of service July 12, 1865, at Charlotte, North Carolina.

== Detailed service ==
Left Ohio for Nashville, Tenn., October 15. Moved from Nashville to Decherd, Tenn., October 1864, and performed guard duty on line of the Nashville & Chattanooga Railroad, Right Wing at Decherd, Left Wing at Elk River Bridge, until January 1865. Moved to Nashville, Tenn., January 6; then moved as supply train guard to Columbia, Tenn., January 10. Returned to Nashville and moved to Washington, D.C.; then to North Carolina January 16-February 25. Campaign of the Carolinas March 1-April 26. Advance on Kinston and Goldsboro March 6–21. Battle of Wyse Fork March 8–10. Occupation of Kinston March 14. Occupation of Goldsboro March 21. Advance on Raleigh April 10–14. Occupation of Raleigh April 14. Bennett's House April 26. Surrender of Johnston and his army. Duty at Raleigh, Greensboro and Charlotte, N.C., until July.

== Casualties ==
The regiment lost a total of 91 men during service; 1 officer and 5 enlisted men killed or mortally wounded, 1 officer and 84 enlisted men due to disease.

== Commanders ==
- Colonel Willard Warner

== See also ==
- List of Ohio Civil War units
- Ohio in the Civil War
