= Tecumseh Furnace, Alabama =

Tecumseh Furnace
- Unincorporated community
- Location in Alabama.
- Coordinates: 33°58′51″N 85°25′29″W
- Country: United States
- State: Alabama
- County: Cherokee
- Elevation: 925 ft (282 m)
- Time zone: UTC-6 (Central (CST))
  - Summer (DST): UTC-5 (CDT)
- Area codes: 256 & 938
- GNIS feature ID: 160728

Tecumseh Furnace is an unincorporated community in Cherokee County, Alabama, United States.

== History ==
The community was centered on a blast furnace that was named for William Tecumseh Sherman.

The Tecumseh Iron Company was organized in 1873 by Willard Warner, who was a brevet brigadier general in the Union Army during the American Civil War. Warner served on General Sherman's staff, so he named the furnace in his honor. It was located on the Selma, Rome and Dalton Railroad and first began operations on February 19, 1874. At the time, it was considered one of the architecturally finest iron furnaces in the South. The furnace had a maximum output of 25 tons of iron produced per day at its peak. The company received mail at the nearby community of Tecumseh, which had a post office from 1873 to 1935. It operated constantly until 1886, and then sporadically from 1886 to October 1890. In 1909, the Birmingham Coal & Iron Company purchased the entire property. The Woodward Iron Company bought the Birmingham Coal & Iron Company on August 4, 1912, and had the furnace dismantled for scrap.
