= Blue Pond, Alabama =

Blue Pond
- Unincorporated community
- Location in Alabama.
- Coordinates: 34°14′13″N 85°43′13″W
- Country: United States
- State: Alabama
- County: Cherokee
- Elevation: 656 ft (200 m)
- Time zone: UTC-6 (Central (CST))
  - Summer (DST): UTC-5 (CDT)
- Area codes: 256 & 938
- GNIS feature ID: 156082

Blue Pond, also spelled Bluepond, is an unincorporated community in Cherokee County, Alabama, United States.

== History ==
A post office called Blue Pond was established in 1850, and remained in operation until it was discontinued in 1907. The community took the name of a neighboring pond.
