= Bomar, Alabama =

Bomar
- Unincorporated community
- Location in Alabama.
- Coordinates: 34°06′31″N 85°34′49″W
- Country: United States
- State: Alabama
- County: Cherokee
- Elevation: 568 ft (173 m)
- Time zone: UTC-6 (Central (CST))
  - Summer (DST): UTC-5 (CDT)
- Area codes: 256 & 938
- GNIS feature ID: 156091

Bomar, also known as Jordan, is an unincorporated community in Cherokee County, Alabama, United States.

== History ==
A post office was established at Bomar in 1890, and operated until being discontinued in 1907. The community was named in honor of Dr. Richard R. Bomar.

The Bomar soil series is named for the community.
