= Cherokee County, Alabama =

County in Alabama, United States

- County
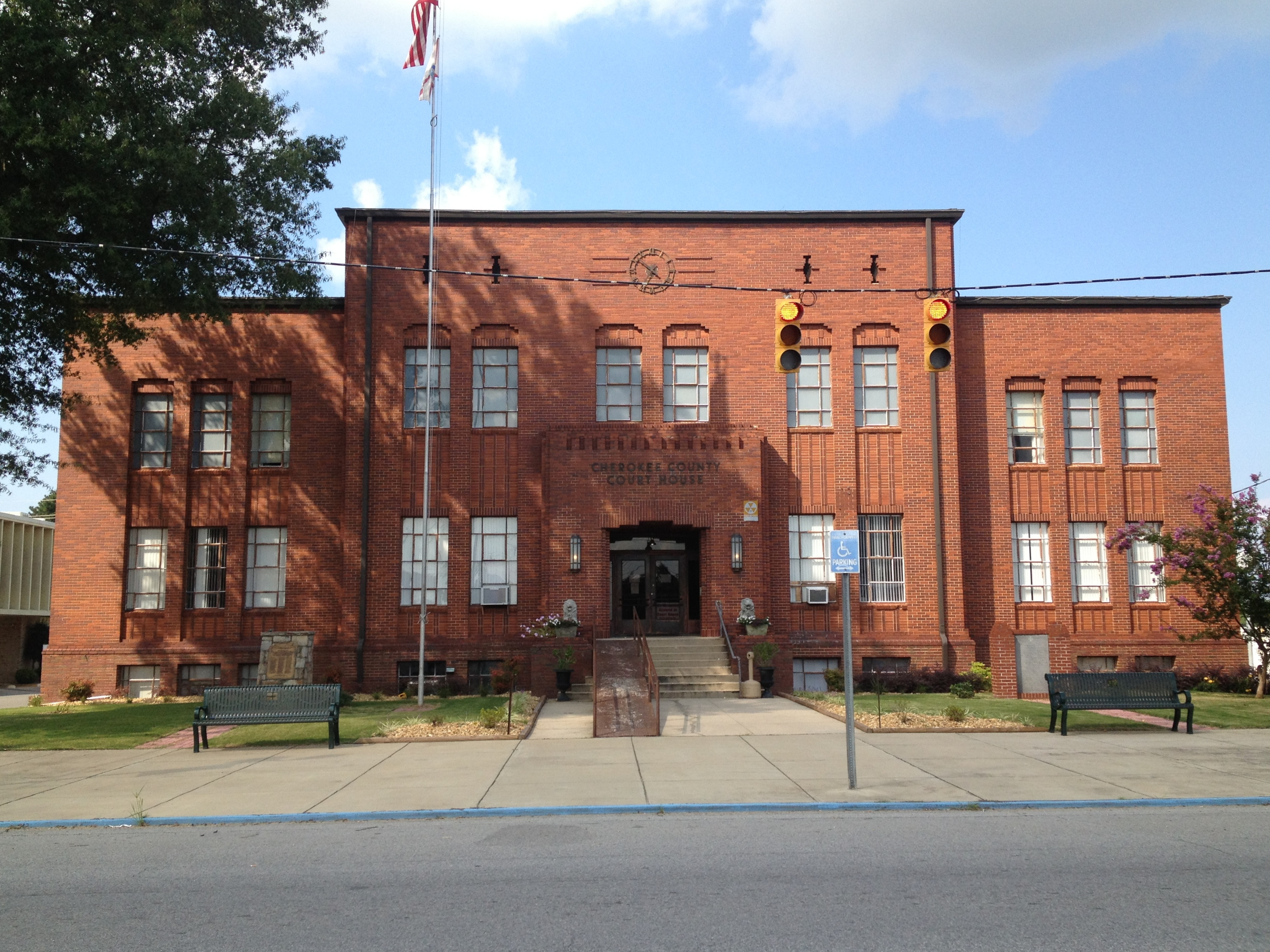
- Cherokee County Courthouse in Centre

- Flag Seal

- Location within the U.S. state of Alabama
- Coordinates: 34°10′11″N 85°35′39″W
- Country: United States
- State: Alabama
- Founded: January 9, 1836
- Named for: Cherokee Nation
- Seat: Centre
- Largest city: Centre

Area
  - Total: 600 sq mi (1,600 km^{2})
  - Land: 554 sq mi (1,430 km^{2})
  - Water: 46 sq mi (120 km^{2}) 7.7%

Population (2020)
  - Total: 24,971
  - Estimate (2025): 26,413 ▲
  - Density: 45.1/sq mi (17.4/km^{2})
- Time zone: UTC−6 (Central)
  - Summer (DST): UTC−5 (CDT)
- Congressional district: 3rd
- Website: www.cherokeecounty-al.gov
- County Number 13 on Alabama Licence Plates

Cherokee County, Alabama is a county located in the northeastern part of the U.S. state of Alabama. As of the 2020 census, the population was 24,971. Its county seat is Centre. The county is named for the Cherokee tribe.

== History ==
The area included in today's Cherokee County, for centuries, had belonged to the Muscogee (Creek) Nation of Native Americans. Cherokees began moving into the area a generation before the forced Indian Removal. To this day, there are few Native Americans in Cherokee County.

On January 9, 1836, the Alabama legislature created Cherokee County with its present boundaries. Two years later, the United States government removed, by force, all Cherokees who had refused to leave on what would become known as the Trail of Tears.

Cherokee County was in the news again on Palm Sunday, March 27, 1994, when it was hit by a F4 tornado. Goshen United Methodist Church was destroyed only 12 minutes after the National Weather Service at Birmingham had issued a warning for northern Calhoun, southeastern Etowah, and southern Cherokee counties.

== Geography ==
According to the United States Census Bureau, the county has a total area of 600 square miles (1,600 km^{2}), of which 554 square miles (1,430 km^{2}) (or 92.19%) is land and 46 square miles (120 km^{2}) (7.7%) is water. It is the second-smallest county in Alabama by land area.

=== Major highways ===
- U.S. Highway 278 / State Route 74 (unsigned)
- U.S. Highway 411 / State Route 25 (unsigned)
- State Route 9
- State Route 35
- State Route 68
- State Route 273
- State Route 283

=== Adjacent counties ===
- DeKalb County - north
- Chattooga County, Georgia - northeast
- Floyd County, Georgia - east
- Polk County, Georgia - southeast
- Cleburne County - south
- Calhoun County - south
- Etowah County - west

=== National protected areas ===
- Little River Canyon National Preserve (part)
- Talladega National Forest (part)

=== Water features ===
- The Coosa River flows through the county, much of it now part of Weiss Lake. The Culstigh Creek, a tributary of the Cattooga River, also flows through Cherokee county.

== Demographics ==
Historical population
| Census | Pop. | Note | %± |
|---|---|---|---|
| 1840 | 8,773 | | — |
| 1850 | 13,884 | | 58.3% |
| 1860 | 18,360 | | 32.2% |
| 1870 | 11,132 | | −39.4% |
| 1880 | 19,108 | | 71.6% |
| 1890 | 20,459 | | 7.1% |
| 1900 | 21,096 | | 3.1% |
| 1910 | 20,226 | | −4.1% |
| 1920 | 20,862 | | 3.1% |
| 1930 | 20,219 | | −3.1% |
| 1940 | 19,928 | | −1.4% |
| 1950 | 17,634 | | −11.5% |
| 1960 | 16,303 | | −7.5% |
| 1970 | 15,606 | | −4.3% |
| 1980 | 18,760 | | 20.2% |
| 1990 | 19,543 | | 4.2% |
| 2000 | 23,988 | | 22.7% |
| 2010 | 25,989 | | 8.3% |
| 2020 | 24,971 | | −3.9% |
| 2025 (est.) | 26,413 | ▲ | 5.8% |
U.S. Decennial Census; 1790–1960 1900–1990; 1990–2000 2010–2020

=== 2020 census ===
As of the 2020 census, the county had a population of 24,971. The median age was 47.7 years. 19.2% of residents were under the age of 18 and 23.5% of residents were 65 years of age or older. For every 100 females there were 97.5 males, and for every 100 females age 18 and over there were 95.9 males age 18 and over.

The racial makeup of the county was 90.9% White, 4.0% Black or African American, 0.4% American Indian and Alaska Native, 0.2% Asian, 0.0% Native Hawaiian and Pacific Islander, 0.8% from some other race, and 3.7% from two or more races. Hispanic or Latino residents of any race comprised 1.6% of the population.

0.0% of residents lived in urban areas, while 100.0% lived in rural areas.

There were 10,411 households in the county, of which 25.9% had children under the age of 18 living with them and 24.3% had a female householder with no spouse or partner present. About 28.2% of all households were made up of individuals and 14.6% had someone living alone who was 65 years of age or older.

There were 14,513 housing units, of which 28.3% were vacant. Among occupied housing units, 79.2% were owner-occupied and 20.8% were renter-occupied. The homeowner vacancy rate was 1.6% and the rental vacancy rate was 7.9%.

=== Racial and ethnic composition ===
Cherokee County, Alabama – Racial and ethnic composition Note: the US Census treats Hispanic/Latino as an ethnic category. This table excludes Latinos from the racial categories and assigns them to a separate category. Hispanics/Latinos may be of any race.
| Race / Ethnicity (NH = Non-Hispanic) | Pop 2000 | Pop 2010 | Pop 2020 | % 2000 | % 2010 | % 2020 |
|---|---|---|---|---|---|---|
| White alone (NH) | 22,164 | 23,929 | 22,563 | 92.40% | 92.07% | 90.36% |
| Black or African American alone (NH) | 1,327 | 1,206 | 987 | 5.53% | 4.64% | 3.95% |
| Native American or Alaska Native alone (NH) | 74 | 122 | 109 | 0.31% | 0.47% | 0.44% |
| Asian alone (NH) | 32 | 49 | 55 | 0.13% | 0.19% | 0.22% |
| Pacific Islander alone (NH) | 0 | 1 | 1 | 0.00% | 0.00% | 0.00% |
| Other race alone (NH) | 3 | 15 | 46 | 0.01% | 0.06% | 0.18% |
| Mixed race or Multiracial (NH) | 184 | 347 | 810 | 0.77% | 1.34% | 3.24% |
| Hispanic or Latino (any race) | 204 | 320 | 400 | 0.85% | 1.23% | 1.60% |
| Total | 23,988 | 25,989 | 24,971 | 100.00% | 100.00% | 100.00% |

=== 2010 ===
As of the census of 2010, there were 25,989 people, 10,626 households, and 7,493 families living in the county. The population density was 47 people per square mile (18 people/km^{2}). There were 16,267 housing units at an average density of 27 units per square mile (10 units/km^{2}). The racial makeup of the county was 92.7% White, 4.6% Black or African American, 0.5% Native American, 0.2% Asian, 0.35% from other races, and 1.5% from two or more races. 1.2% of the population were Hispanic or Latino of any race.

Of the 10,626 households 25.1% had children under the age of 18 living with them, 55.3% were married couples living together, 10.4% had a female householder with no husband present, and 29.5% were non-families. 26.0% of households were one person and 10.4% were one person aged 65 or older. The average household size was 2.42 and the average family size was 2.89.

The age distribution was 21.4% under the age of 18, 7.3% from 18 to 24, 22.8% from 25 to 44, 30.6% from 45 to 64, and 17.9% 65 or older. The median age was 43.9 years. For every 100 females there were 98.4 males. For every 100 females age 18 and over, there were 101.8 males.

The median household income was $40,690 and the median family income was $47,365. Males had a median income of $40,050 versus $27,352 for females. The per capita income for the county was $21,322. About 13.7% of families and 17.6% of the population were below the poverty line, including 27.3% of those under age 18 and 9.4% of those age 65 or over.

=== 2000 ===
As of the census of 2000, there were 23,988 people, 9,719 households, and 7,201 families living in the county. The population density was 43 people per square mile (17 people/km^{2}). There were 14,025 housing units at an average density of 25 units per square mile (9.7 units/km^{2}). The racial makeup of the county was 92.83% White, 5.54% Black or African American, 0.31% Native American, 0.14% Asian, 0.35% from other races, and 0.83% from two or more races. 0.85% of the population were Hispanic or Latino of any race. Of the 9,719 households 28.90% had children under the age of 18 living with them, 61.40% were married couples living together, 9.20% had a female householder with no husband present, and 25.90% were non-families. 23.90% of households were one person and 10.40% were one person aged 65 or older. The average household size was 2.43 and the average family size was 2.86.

The age distribution was 22.20% under the age of 18, 7.60% from 18 to 24, 27.60% from 25 to 44, 26.70% from 45 to 64, and 15.90% 65 or older. The median age was 40 years. For every 100 females there were 96.70 males. For every 100 females age 18 and over, there were 93.50 males.

The median household income was $30,874 and the median family income was $36,920. Males had a median income of $29,978 versus $20,958 for females. The per capita income for the county was $15,543. About 11.80% of families and 15.60% of the population were below the poverty line, including 20.40% of those under age 18 and 14.90% of those age 65 or over.

== Education ==
Cherokee County contains one public school district. There are approximately 3,800 students in public K-12 schools in Cherokee County.

The county contains one public higher education institution. Gadsden State Community College operates a campus located in Centre.

=== Districts ===
School districts include:

- Cherokee County School District

== Government ==
Historically Democratic, Cherokee County became competitive by the end of the 20th century and is now reliably Republican at the presidential level. The last Democrat to win the county in a presidential election is Bill Clinton, who won it by a comfortable margin in 1996.

United States presidential election results for Cherokee County, Alabama
| Year | Republican | | Democratic | | Third party(ies) | |
| Year | No. | % | No. | % | No. | % |
|---|---|---|---|---|---|---|
| 1836 | 242 | 57.35% | 180 | 42.65% | 0 | 0.00% |
| 1840 | 377 | 33.19% | 759 | 66.81% | 0 | 0.00% |
| 1844 | 356 | 27.15% | 955 | 72.85% | 0 | 0.00% |
| 1848 | 630 | 40.65% | 920 | 59.35% | 0 | 0.00% |
| 1852 | 242 | 24.77% | 735 | 75.23% | 0 | 0.00% |
| 1856 | 455 | 22.84% | 1,537 | 77.16% | 0 | 0.00% |
| 1860 | 0 | 0.00% | 223 | 9.08% | 2,233 | 90.92% |
| 1868 | 167 | 15.46% | 913 | 84.54% | 0 | 0.00% |
| 1872 | 228 | 15.69% | 1,225 | 84.31% | 0 | 0.00% |
| 1876 | 293 | 14.96% | 1,666 | 85.04% | 0 | 0.00% |
| 1880 | 180 | 11.46% | 1,390 | 88.54% | 0 | 0.00% |
| 1884 | 427 | 23.41% | 1,397 | 76.59% | 0 | 0.00% |
| 1888 | 333 | 16.32% | 1,686 | 82.65% | 21 | 1.03% |
| 1892 | 139 | 4.41% | 1,709 | 54.24% | 1,303 | 41.35% |
| 1896 | 602 | 24.23% | 1,776 | 71.47% | 107 | 4.31% |
| 1900 | 1,169 | 41.94% | 1,167 | 41.87% | 451 | 16.18% |
| 1904 | 502 | 29.67% | 905 | 53.49% | 285 | 16.84% |
| 1908 | 602 | 42.63% | 712 | 50.42% | 98 | 6.94% |
| 1912 | 88 | 5.03% | 814 | 46.57% | 846 | 48.40% |
| 1916 | 508 | 30.31% | 1,136 | 67.78% | 32 | 1.91% |
| 1920 | 1,576 | 43.74% | 1,969 | 54.65% | 58 | 1.61% |
| 1924 | 845 | 37.13% | 1,380 | 60.63% | 51 | 2.24% |
| 1928 | 1,515 | 62.78% | 894 | 37.05% | 4 | 0.17% |
| 1932 | 359 | 15.72% | 1,897 | 83.09% | 27 | 1.18% |
| 1936 | 374 | 14.92% | 2,114 | 84.32% | 19 | 0.76% |
| 1940 | 381 | 12.66% | 2,617 | 86.94% | 12 | 0.40% |
| 1944 | 408 | 18.55% | 1,774 | 80.64% | 18 | 0.82% |
| 1948 | 217 | 16.78% | 0 | 0.00% | 1,076 | 83.22% |
| 1952 | 539 | 16.79% | 2,664 | 82.96% | 8 | 0.25% |
| 1956 | 845 | 24.05% | 2,661 | 75.75% | 7 | 0.20% |
| 1960 | 872 | 21.95% | 3,097 | 77.95% | 4 | 0.10% |
| 1964 | 1,893 | 49.70% | 0 | 0.00% | 1,916 | 50.30% |
| 1968 | 343 | 6.03% | 462 | 8.13% | 4,880 | 85.84% |
| 1972 | 3,179 | 71.89% | 1,182 | 26.73% | 61 | 1.38% |
| 1976 | 1,492 | 23.85% | 4,668 | 74.62% | 96 | 1.53% |
| 1980 | 2,482 | 38.55% | 3,764 | 58.47% | 192 | 2.98% |
| 1984 | 3,225 | 51.04% | 3,029 | 47.93% | 65 | 1.03% |
| 1988 | 2,868 | 47.01% | 3,176 | 52.06% | 57 | 0.93% |
| 1992 | 2,745 | 34.85% | 4,222 | 53.61% | 909 | 11.54% |
| 1996 | 3,048 | 36.20% | 4,399 | 52.24% | 974 | 11.57% |
| 2000 | 4,154 | 53.10% | 3,497 | 44.70% | 172 | 2.20% |
| 2004 | 5,923 | 65.45% | 3,040 | 33.59% | 86 | 0.95% |
| 2008 | 7,298 | 74.89% | 2,306 | 23.66% | 141 | 1.45% |
| 2012 | 7,506 | 76.65% | 2,132 | 21.77% | 154 | 1.57% |
| 2016 | 8,953 | 83.42% | 1,547 | 14.41% | 233 | 2.17% |
| 2020 | 10,583 | 86.03% | 1,624 | 13.20% | 94 | 0.76% |
| 2024 | 11,358 | 87.33% | 1,553 | 11.94% | 95 | 0.73% |

United States Senate election results for Cherokee County, Alabama2
| Year | Republican | | Democratic | | Third party(ies) | |
| Year | No. | % | No. | % | No. | % |
|---|---|---|---|---|---|---|
| 2020 | 10,122 | 82.62% | 2,112 | 17.24% | 17 | 0.14% |

United States Senate election results for Cherokee County, Alabama3
| Year | Republican | | Democratic | | Third party(ies) | |
| Year | No. | % | No. | % | No. | % |
|---|---|---|---|---|---|---|
| 2022 | 6,947 | 88.64% | 761 | 9.71% | 129 | 1.65% |

Alabama Gubernatorial election results for Cherokee County
| Year | Republican | | Democratic | | Third party(ies) | |
| Year | No. | % | No. | % | No. | % |
|---|---|---|---|---|---|---|
| 2022 | 6,971 | 88.94% | 653 | 8.33% | 214 | 2.73% |

== Communities ==
=== Cities ===
- Centre (County Seat)
- Piedmont (partly in Calhoun County)

=== Towns ===
- Cedar Bluff
- Collinsville (Partly in DeKalb County)
- Gaylesville
- Leesburg
- Sand Rock (Partly in DeKalb County)

=== Census-designated places ===
- Broomtown
- Spring Garden

=== Unincorporated communities ===
- Alexis
- Bluffton
- Blue Pond
- Bomar
- Congo
- Ellisville
- Elrath
- Forney
- Hurley
- Key
- McCord Crossroads
- McFrey Crossroads
- McGhee
- Moshat
- Newberry Crossroads
- Pleasant Gap
- Rock Run
- Round Mountain
- Sanford Springs
- Tecumseh Furnace

=== Ghost towns ===
- Bluffton
- Turkey Town

== See also ==
- National Register of Historic Places listings in Cherokee County, Alabama
- Properties on the Alabama Register of Landmarks and Heritage in Cherokee County, Alabama
