= Blue Pond (Biei) =

Pond in Hokkaidō, Japan

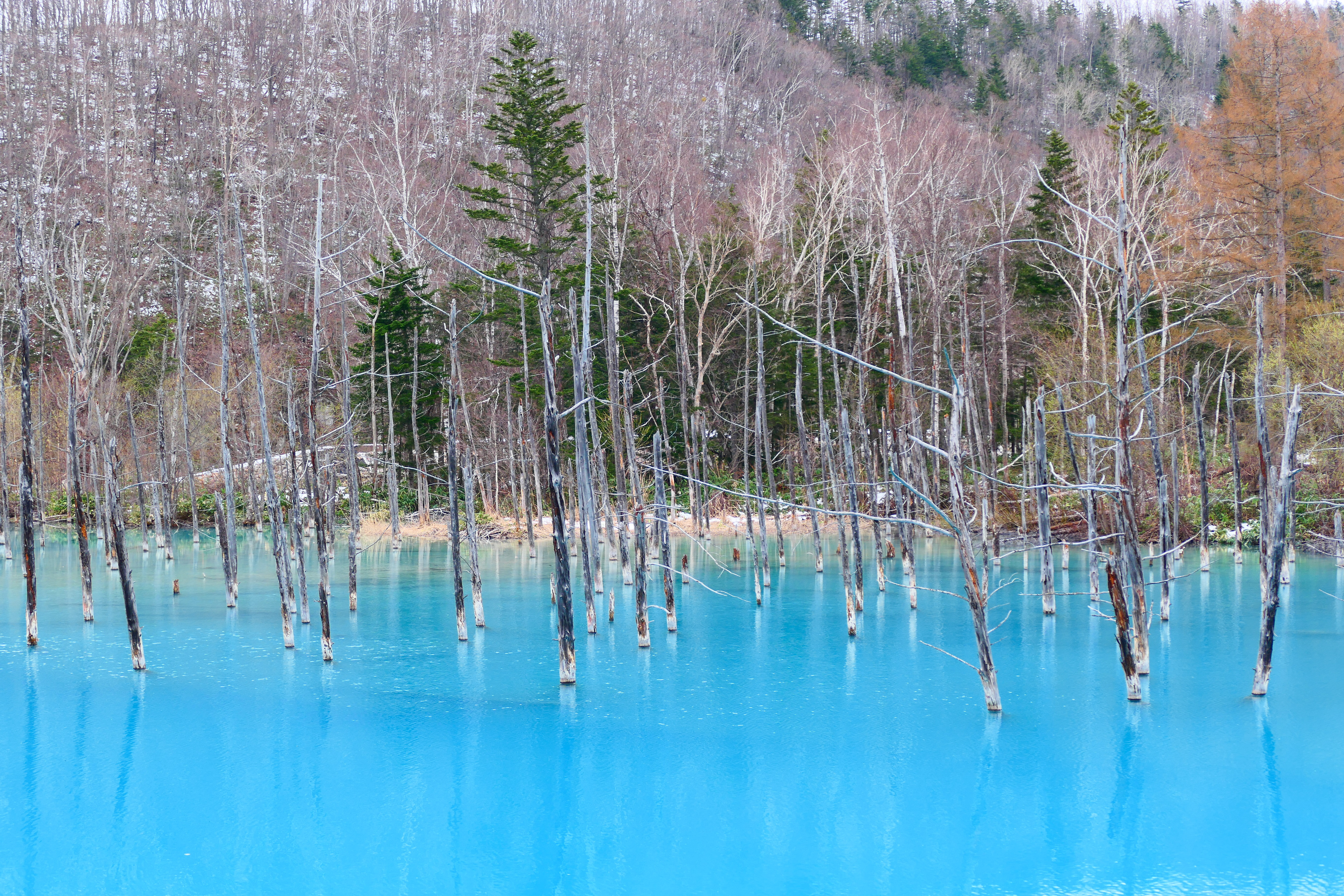
- Blue Pond in Biei, Hokkaido

- Location within Japan
- Location: Biei, Hokkaido, Japan
- Coordinates: 43°29′37″N 142°36′51″E
- Type: man-made pond

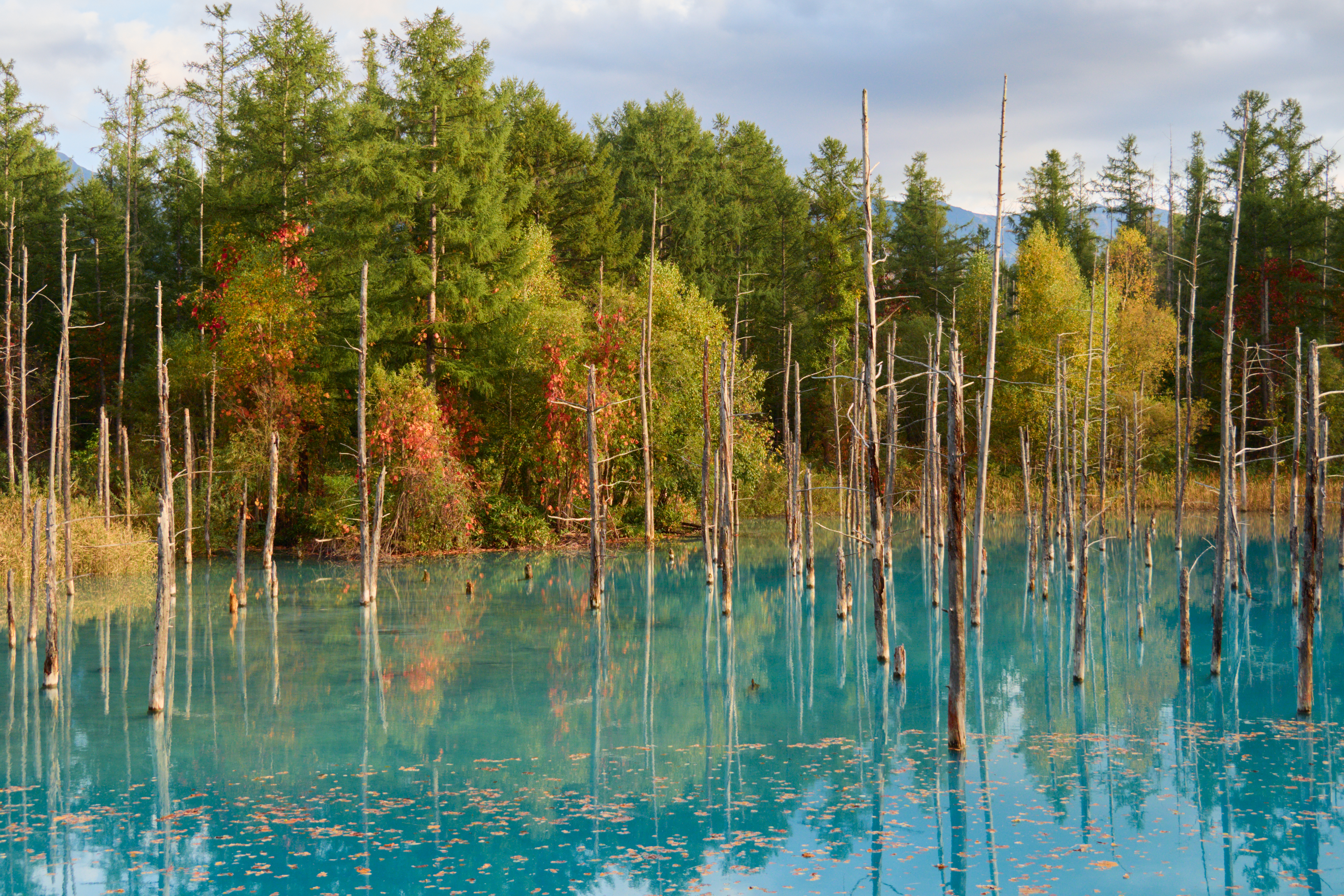
Shirogane Blue Pond in autumn

Blue Pond (青い池, Aoi-ike) is a man-made pond feature in Biei, Hokkaido, Japan. It is the result of works on the Biei River (美瑛川), carried out after the 1988 eruption of Mount Tokachi, to protect the town of Biei from volcanic mudflows. The colour is thought to result from the accidental presence of colloidal aluminium hydroxide in the water. Damage caused by Typhoon Mindulle in August 2016 resulted in a temporary drop in the water level and in the colour briefly turning brown with mud and sand from the Biei River.

== See also ==
- List of Natural Monuments of Japan (Hokkaidō)
