= Alabama State Route 35 =

State highway in Alabama, United States

State Route 35

Route information
- Maintained by ALDOT
- Length: 68.291 mi (109.904 km)
- Existed: 1940–present

Major junctions
- South end: SR 9 northeast of Cedar Bluff
- SR 68 at Gaylesville SR 273 at Blanche; SR 176 southeast of Fort Payne; US 11 at Fort Payne; I-59 at Fort Payne; SR 75 at Rainsville; SR 71 at Section; SR 40 south of Scottsboro; US 72 / SR 279 at Scottsboro SR 79 northwest of Scottsboro
- North end: US 72 near Woodville

Location
- Country: United States
- State: Alabama

Highway system
- Alabama State Highway System; Interstate; US; State
← SR 34	→ SR 36

State Route 35 (SR 35) is a 68.291-mile-long (109.904 km) state highway in the northeastern part of the U.S. state of Alabama. The southern terminus of the highway is at its intersection with SR 9 in rural Cherokee County northeast of Cedar Bluff and near the Georgia state line. The northern terminus of the highway is at Woodville in Jackson County where it has a second intersection with U.S. Route 72 (US 72).

== Route description ==
North of its southern terminus, SR 35 begins an ascent over Lookout Mountain as a two-lane road. The highway heads in a northwesterly direction as it travels through the Little River Canyon National Preserve along the county line dividing Cherokee County and DeKalb County leading into Fort Payne. As the highway descends Lookout Mountain, within the Fort Payne city limits, it makes a 90-degree right turn at the foot of the mountain. Numerous trucks descending this route have suffered brake failure and wrecked at this turn as a result, causing numerous fatalities. One resident living at this turn, Joe Faulkner, erected a reinforced concrete wall to protect his property. The wall assumed the popular name, "Joe's Truck Stop."

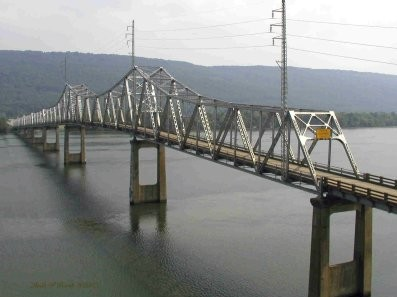
Comer Bridge (1930) carrying the southbound lanes of SR 35 over the Tennessee River at Scottsboro

From Fort Payne, SR 35 is routed along a four-lane divided highway as it heads towards Rainsville. The highway is a four-lane highway from its intersection with US 11 in Fort Payne to its intersection with US 72 in Scottsboro, except for a brief stretch from near its intersection with SR 71 in Section, to the foot of Sand Mountain and the east bank of the Tennessee River, where it intersects SR 40. The Alabama Department of Transportation plans to eventually four-lane this remaining section of the Fort Payne–Scottsboro route. The highway crosses the Tennessee River over the Comer Bridge (southbound) and the Bob Jones Bridge (northbound). A new bridge is under construction to replace the Comer Bridge, and was expected to open in 2012, but finally opened May 2016. In the early 1990s, a section of the highway was rerouted from a dogleg extending from Fort Payne through Pine Ridge to Rainsville along the natural slope of Sand Mountain, to the current four-lane route. The current route reaches the brow of Sand Mountain along a ramp through a manmade gap in the side of the mountain.

Until 1980, the northern terminus of SR 35 was at Scottsboro, where it intersected US 72. It was extended westward along the former alignment of US 72 after the U.S. Highway was relocated to a new four-lane highway between Scottsboro and Huntsville. Although SR 35 travels in a south by southwestward trajectory as it leaves Scottsboro, it is signed as “SR 35 north” until its terminus at a second intersection with US 72 at Woodville in western Jackson County.

== Major intersections ==
County	Location	mi	km	Destinations	Notes
Cherokee	Lawrence	0.000	0.000	SR 9 – Rome, Georgia, Cedar Bluff, Centre, Piedmont	Southern terminus
Cherokee	Gaylesville	2.576	4.146	SR 68 – Cedar Bluff, Summerville	
Cherokee	Blanche	11.205	18.033	SR 273 south / CR 15 north	Northern terminus of SR 273
DeKalb		14.324	23.052	SR 176 west (Little River Canyon Rim Parkway)	Eastern terminus of SR 176; northern terminus of Little River Canyon Rim Parkway
DeKalb	Fort Payne	21.983	35.378	US 11 north (Gault Avenue / SR 7) to I-59 north	South end of US 11/SR 7 concurrency
DeKalb	Fort Payne	23.038	37.076	US 11 south (Gault Avenue / SR 7) – Attalla	North end of US 11/SR 7 concurrency
DeKalb	Fort Payne	24.164	38.888	I-59 – Gadsden, Chattanooga	I-59 exit 218
DeKalb	Rainsville	31.743	51.085	SR 75 (McCurdy Avenue) – Fyffe, Shiloh, Sylvania, Henagar	
Jackson	Section	41.616	66.974	SR 71 north – Dutton, Trenton	Southern terminus of SR 71
Jackson		46.211	74.369	SR 40 east – Henagar	Western terminus of SR 40
Jackson	Scottsboro	49.539	79.725	US 72 / SR 279 south (SR 2) – Huntsville, Chattanooga	Interchange; south end of SR 279 concurrency
Jackson	Scottsboro	50.490	81.256	SR 279 north (Willow Street) / CR 21 north (Tupelo Pike)	North end of SR 279 concurrency
Jackson	Scottsboro	55.008	88.527	SR 79 – Guntersville, Skyline	
Jackson	Woodville	68.291	109.904	US 72 (SR 2) – Huntsville, Chattanooga	Northern terminus
1.000 mi = 1.609 km; 1.000 km = 0.621 mi: Concurrency terminus
