= Alabama State Route 279 =

State highway in Alabama, United States

State Route 279

Route information
- Maintained by ALDOT
- Length: 9.258 mi (14.899 km)

Major junctions
- South end: SR 79 in Scottsboro
- North end: US 72 in Scottsboro

Location
- Country: United States
- State: Alabama
- Counties: Jackson

Highway system
- Alabama State Highway System; Interstate; US; State
← US 278	→ US 280

State Route 279 (SR 279) is a 9-mile-long (14 km) state highway in Jackson County.

== Route description ==
SR 279 begins at the intersection with SR 79 in Scottsboro. From here, the route heads northeast on South Broad Street, a five-lane road with a center left-turn lane that immediately crosses a Norfolk Southern railroad line. The route runs through wooded areas with some residential and commercial development. Farther northeast, SR 279 curves to the north and comes to an interchange with US 72/SR 2. At this point, SR 279 heads northeast for a concurrency with US 72/SR 2 on a four-lane divided highway, passing a few businesses. The road reaches an interchange with SR 35, where SR 279 splits from US 72/SR 2 and heads northwest along with SR 35 on Veterans Drive, a three-lane road with a center left-turn lane. The road passes through forests before curving north into residential areas. The two routes come to an intersection with US 72 Bus., where SR 35 turns west to join that route while SR 279 turns east to join that route on East Willow Street, a five-lane road with a center left-turn lane. The road heads past businesses, curving to the northeast. The two routes continue through wooded areas of residential and commercial establishments, passing to the southeast of Scottsboro Municipal Airport. US 72 Bus./SR 279 heads into woodland and comes to an end at an interchange with US 72/SR 2 on the border of Scottsboro and Scottsboro.

== History ==
SR 279 is routed along the former route of SR 79. In the 1980s, a bypass was constructed around the west side of Scottsboro, which alleviated congestion in the city. When the bypass was completed, SR 79 was routed on the new roadway and SR 279 was created.

== Major intersections ==
The entire route is in Scottsboro, Jackson County.

mi	km	Destinations	Notes
0.000	0.000	SR 79 – Guntersville, Skyline	Southern terminus
3.124	5.028	US 72 west (John T Reid Parkway/SR 2) – Huntsville	Southern end of US 72 concurrency; interchange
4.953	7.971	US 72 east (John T Reid Parkway/SR 2) / SR 35 south (Veterans Drive) – Chattanooga, Section	Northern end of US 72 concurrency; southern end of SR 35 concurrency; interchange
5.904	9.502	US 72 Bus. west / SR 35 north (E Willow Street) – Woodville	Northern end of SR 35 concurrency; southern end of US 72 Bus. concurrency
9.258	14.899	US 72 (John T Reid Parkway/SR 2) – Huntsville, Chattanooga	Northern terminus; northern end of US 72 Bus. concurrency; interchange
1.000 mi = 1.609 km; 1.000 km = 0.621 mi: Concurrency terminus
