= Alabama State Route 273 =

State highway in Alabama, United States

State Route 273

Route information
- Maintained by ALDOT
- Length: 15.836 mi (25.486 km)
- Existed: 1973–present

Major junctions
- South end: SR 68 in Leesburg
- North end: SR 35 near Gaylesville

Location
- Country: United States
- State: Alabama
- Counties: Cherokee

Highway system
- Alabama State Highway System; Interstate; US; State
← SR 271	→ SR 275

State Route 273 (SR 273) is a 15.836-mile-long (25.486 km) route in Cherokee County in the northeastern part of Alabama. The southern terminus of the route is at its junction with SR 68 at Leesburg. The northern terminus of the route is at its junction with SR 35 near Gaylesville.

== Route description ==
SR 273 extends northeasterly from its origin, skirting along the north side of Weiss Lake. The route was designated in 1973 along the former route of County Road 15 (CR 15). The two-lane route has numerous curves as it passes through rural areas in the foothills of the Appalachian Mountains. SR 273 crosses Weiss Lake at the Yellow Creek channel between mileposts 3 and 4, the piers of an old bridge can be seen to the north from the bridge. Lookout Mountain rises to the northwest of the Route and is visible for essentially the entire length of the road. The predominant land uses along the road are mixed forests, agricultural fields (crops and grazing lands), and single residence homes. Numerous small churches dot the roadside, predominantly United Methodist. The only waterway crossed which is identified by a roadsign sign is the Little River (milepost 9) which descends Lookout Mountain and passes through DeSoto State Park and Little River Canyon National Preserve. Typical speed limit on SR 273 is 45 mph (72 km/h). This Route is notable for having no motorist services along its length in the form of open service stations; Yellow Creek Falls Marina does have limited supplies but no automotive fuel.

== Major intersections ==
The entire route is in Cherokee County.

Location	mi	km	Destinations	Notes
Leesburg	0.0	0.0	SR 68 (Industrial Boulevard) – Downtown, Sand Rock	Southern terminus
Blanche	15.836	25.486	SR 35 – Gaylesville, Fort Payne	Northern terminus
1.000 mi = 1.609 km; 1.000 km = 0.621 mi
