= DeSoto Falls =

DeSoto Falls is the name of more than one place in the United States of America:

- DeSoto Falls (Alabama)
- DeSoto Falls (Georgia)
