= Alabama State Route 176 =

Highway in Alabama, United States

State Route 176

Route information
- Maintained by ALDOT
- Length: 25.618 mi (41.228 km)
- Existed: 1990–present

Major junctions
- West end: SR 68 near Sand Rock
- East end: SR 35 near Adamsburg

Location
- Country: United States
- State: Alabama
- Counties: DeKalb

Highway system
- Alabama State Highway System; Interstate; US; State
| ← SR 175 | → SR 177 |

State Route 176 (SR 176) was created in September 1980 along previous County/Secondary State Roads 81 and 89 in DeKalb County and part of County/Secondary State Road 89 in Cherokee County. Part of the route took over what had been State Route 275 and forms the northern end of the Little River Canyon Rim Parkway: a scenic, but severely substandard highway following the northern rim of the limestone canyon for 22 miles (35 km).

== Route description ==
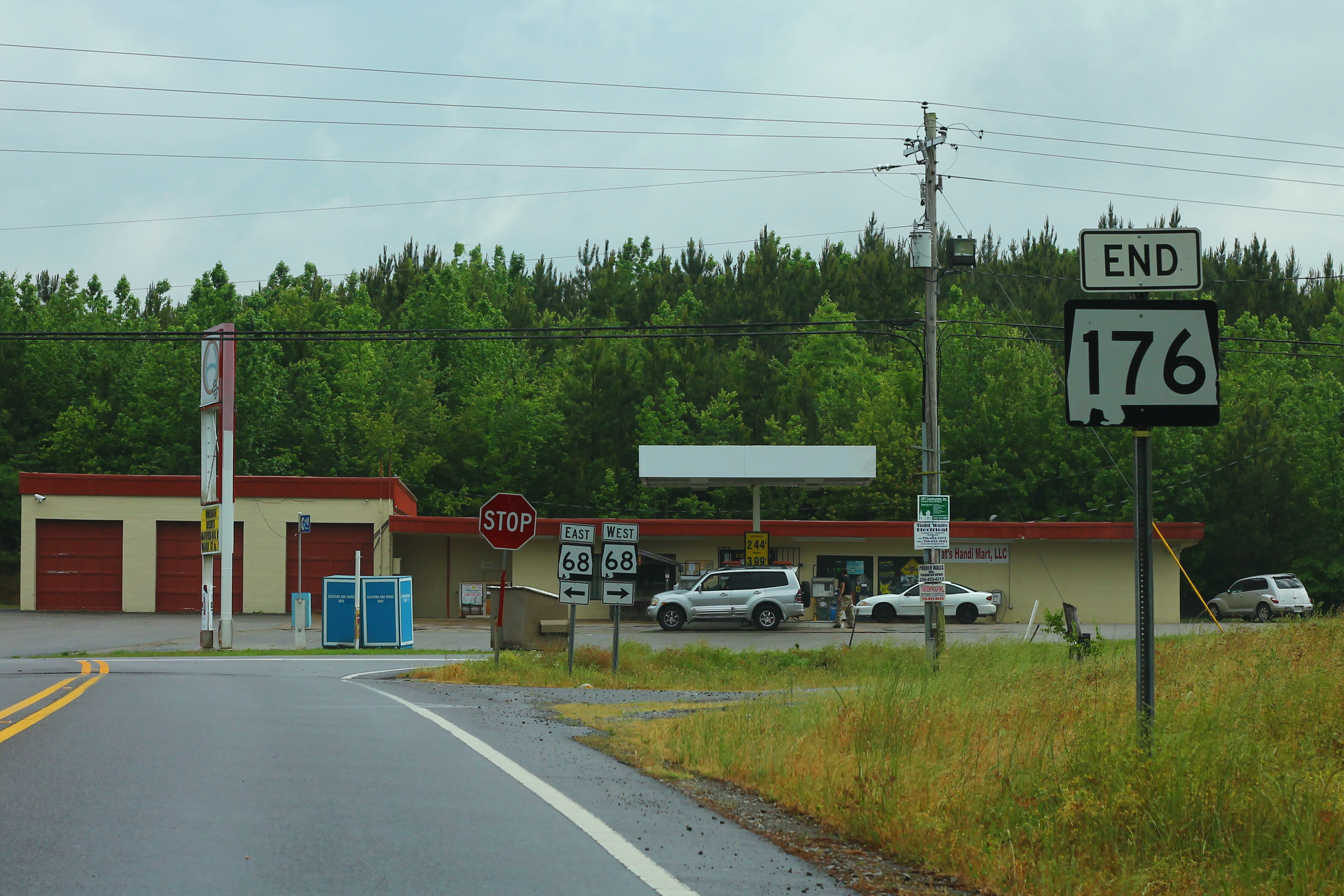
Western terminus of AL 176

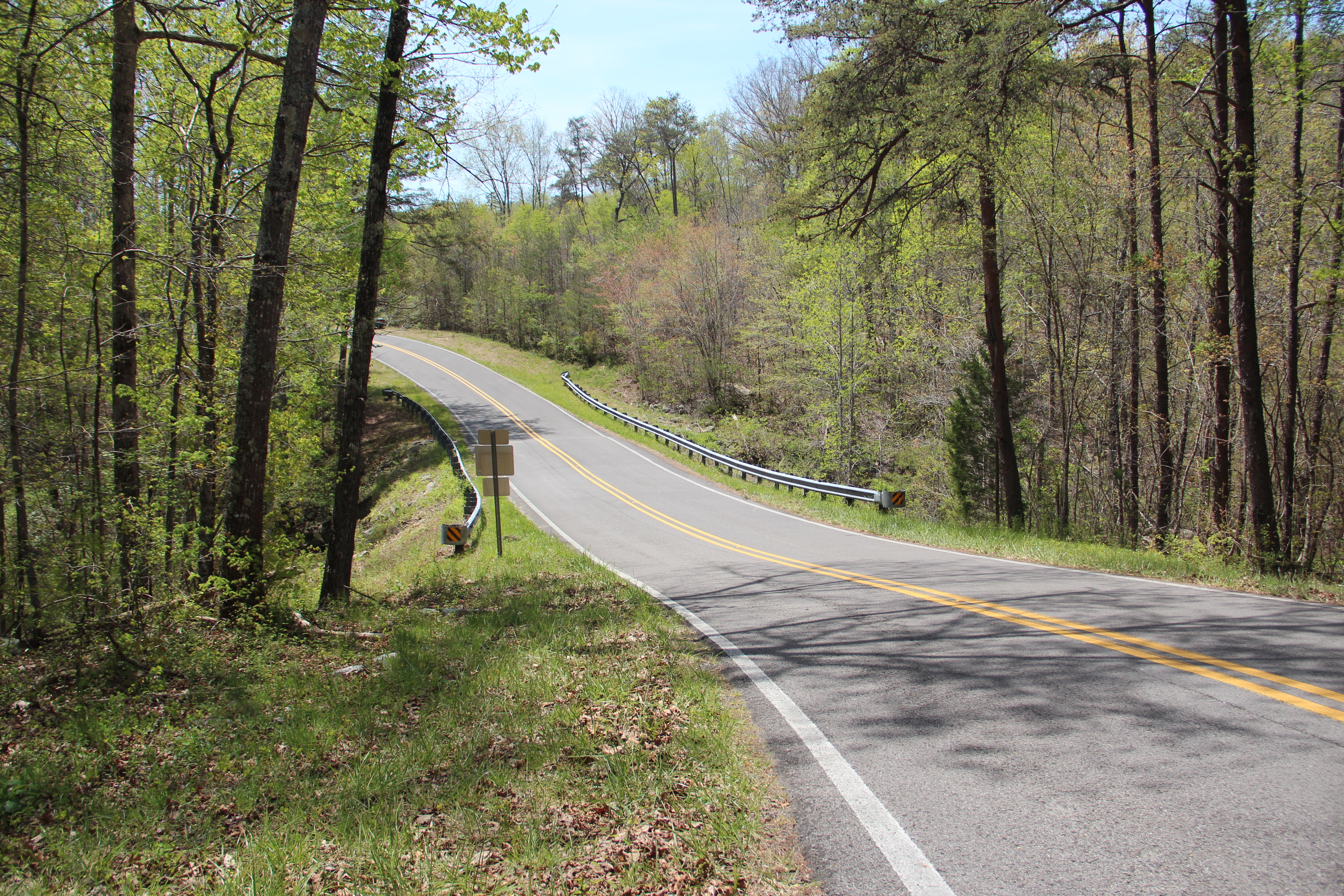
State Route 176 inside the Little River Canyon National Preserve

State Route 176 only follows half of that route, beginning at State Route 35 south of Fort Payne continuing west for 11 miles (18 km) before forking off from Old State Route 275 at Eberhardt's Point west to the Dogtown community. In the Dogtown community, State Route 176 (which up to that point followed former County Road 81) turns southwest at a four-way intersection along part of what had been Dekalb County Road 89. From there, the route extends into Cherokee County to State Route 68 near Collinsville where the highway ends. The road, however, continues south as Cherokee County Road 3 to Gadsden.

== Major intersections ==
The entire route is in DeKalb County.

| Location | mi | km | Destinations | Notes |
|---|---|---|---|---|
| | 0.000 | 0.000 | SR 68 – Collinsville, Sand Rock, Leesburg | Western terminus |
| Eberhardt Point | 14.0 | 22.5 | CR 148 (Little River Canyon Rim Parkway south) to CR 275 | SR 176 begins to follow the Parkway |
| | 25.618 | 41.228 | SR 35 – Gaylesville, Fort Payne | Eastern terminus of SR 176; northern terminus of the Parkway |
1.000 mi = 1.609 km; 1.000 km = 0.621 mi: Route transition
