= Eugene Harris (basketball) =

American basketball coach and player (born 1955)

Biographical details
- Born: February 22, 1955 (age 70); Scottsboro, Alabama, U.S.

Playing career
- 1974–1978: Florida State
- Position(s): Point guard

Coaching career (HC unless noted)
- 1980–1981: Pelham HS
- 1981–1983: James S. Rickards HS
- 1983–1984: South Alabama (assistant)
- 1984–1994: Clemson (assistant)
- 1994–2001: Auburn (assistant)
- 2005–2006: Alabama (assistant)
- 2006–2007: Smith Station HS
- 2007: Georgia State (assistant)
- 2007–2011: Florida A&M
- 2012–2015: Jacksonville State (assistant)

Head coaching record
- Overall: 46–80 (.365)

Eugene Harris (born February 22, 1955) is an American former basketball coach and player. Harris was the head coach of the Florida A&M Rattlers basketball team from 2007 to 2011.

== Early life and high school ==
Eugene Harris was born on February 22, 1955, and was a native of Scottsboro, Alabama. He graduated from Scottsboro High School, where he played basketball.

== College career ==
Harris attended Florida State University, where he continued playing basketball under Hugh Durham. Harris was twice a captain for the basketball team that made it to the NCAA Tournament in 1978. He graduated from Florida State with a bachelor's degree in physical education in 1979.

== Coaching career ==
=== High school and assistant coaching ===
After graduating from Florida State, Harris first coached at the high school level, being the head coach for the basketball teams at Pelham High School in Pelham, Georgia and James S. Rickards High School in Tallahassee, Florida. Harris received his first college coaching job in 1983 as an assistant coach for the South Alabama men's basketball team. He only stayed a year at South Alabama, leaving in 1984 to become an assistant coach for the Clemson Tigers men's basketball team, which he would hold until 1994. Harris joined the Auburn Tigers men's basketball team before the 1994–95 season. He served as an assistant coach there from 1994 to 2001, when he then became an assistant athletics director, serving in that capacity until 2005. Harris then joined the Alabama Crimson Tide men's basketball team for the 2005–06 season as an assistant coach. He only coached at Alabama for one year before spending only one year as head coach for Smiths Station High School in Smiths Station, Alabama during the 2006–07 season. Harris was later initially hired as an assistant coach for the Georgia State Panthers men's basketball team but left Georgia State a month before the season started.

=== Florida A&M ===
Harris departed Georgia State to become the head coach for the Florida A&M Rattlers basketball team shortly before the 2007–08 season started. After coaching there for four years and compiling a 46–80 record, Harris was fired following the 2010–11 season.

=== Return to assistant coaching ===
Harris joined the Jacksonville State Gamecocks men's basketball team as an assistant coach in 2012 and coached there until 2015.

== Head coaching record ==
Statistics overview
Season	Team	Overall	Conference	Standing	Postseason
Florida A&M Rattlers (MEAC) (2007–2011)
2007–08	Florida A&M	15–17	9–7	T–5th	
2008–09	Florida A&M	10–21	6–10	T–8th	
2009–10	Florida A&M	9–22	5–11	10th	
2010–11	Florida A&M	12–20	7–9	7th	
Florida A&M:		46–80 (.365)	27–37 (.422)		
Total:		46–80 (.365)			
National champion Postseason invitational champion Conference regular season champion Conference regular season and conference tournament champion Division regular season champion Division regular season and conference tournament champion Conference tournament champion
