= List of waterfalls in Alabama =

List of waterfalls in Alabama is a list of waterfalls in the U.S. state of Alabama.

== List of waterfalls ==
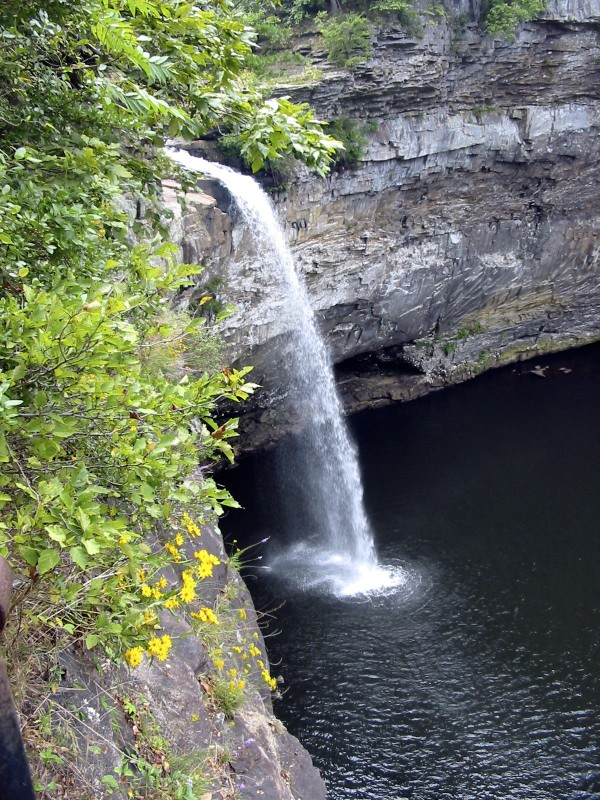
DeSoto Falls, Alabama

- Butler Falls:
- Caney Creek Falls: Near Double Springs, within the Sipsey Wilderness area of the Bankhead National Forest. Note: The falls are considered a dispersed recreation area. The distance is approximately 1.7 miles (2.7 km) down the Caney Creek Canyon, descending 200 feet (61 m) to the falls. The trail is unofficial and considered a "Social trail", Access is through private property and may be allowed with permission.
- Cheaha Falls: Talladega National Forest
- Chewacla Falls: Chewacla State Park, near Auburn, Lee County.
- Chinnabee Silent Trail Falls. Talladega National Forest
- DeSoto Falls: Also called Indian Falls. 31.7 m (104 ft) falls, Fort Payne. Not to be confused with the three DeSoto Falls of Georgia in the DeSoto Falls Scenic Area of the Chattahoochee-Oconee National Forest. The Upper DeSoto Falls, Middle DeSoto Falls, and Lower DeSoto Falls. The upper waterfall drops 200 feet (61 m), the middle waterfall drops 67 feet (20 m), and the lower waterfall drops 35 feet (11 m).
- Devil's Den Falls is a small waterfall within the Talladega National Forest in Clay County's Cheaha State Park. It is located in the Lake Chinnabee Recreation Area, 800 meters (2,600 ft) up the Chinnabee Silent Trail.
- Ditto Falls: Located in the Bankhead National Forest.
- Eagle Creek Falls:
- Fall Creek Falls:
- Falling Rock Falls: Shelby County.
- Grace's High Falls – 40.5 m (133 ft), highest in Alabama, Little River Canyon National Preserve, DeKalb County.
- Great falls: Northwest of Phenix City.
- Griffin Falls: A double drop, cascading to a 40 feet (12 m) drop. Falls are on private property.
- Hidden Falls Waterfall in Auburn
- High Falls Park: The 35 feet (11 m) High Falls along Town Creek, in Geneva County, Alabama, can be as wide as 300 feet (91 m) at times. A pedestrian bridge above the falls crosses the creek, providing a lookout in either direction. (34.40036351177515, -86.06837960922309)
- Holmes Chapel Falls, Bankhead National Forest, Winston County.
- King’s Shower, 396 feet, Jackson County (cave falls; spelunking required)
- Kinlock Falls: A cascading falls within the Sipsey Wilderness area, Lawrence County
- Larkwood Falls:
- Little Uchee Creek:
- Little River Canyon Falls Park.
- Little River Falls – 14 m (46 ft), Gaylesville. Formerly, Martha’s Falls, and known locally as Hippie Hole in the Little River Canyon National Preserve.
- Lower Factory Falls:
- Mardis Mill Falls:
- Mize Mill Falls: In the Tipsey Wilderness.
- Moss Rock Preserve and waterfalls: Hoover. Moderate difficulty.
- Neversink Falls: 162 feet, Jackson County (cave falls; DO NOT go without prior permission)
- Noccalula Falls – 27 m (89 ft), Gadsden
- Parker Cascades: Above Parker Falls
- Parker Falls: Near Haleyville. Cascading falls. The hike is 1.8 miles (2.9 km) and rated as a "Moderate Challenge".
- Peavine Falls: South of Birmingham, in the Oak Mountain State Park. Accessed by the Green and White Trail Loop, there is a 305 feet (93 m) elevation change.

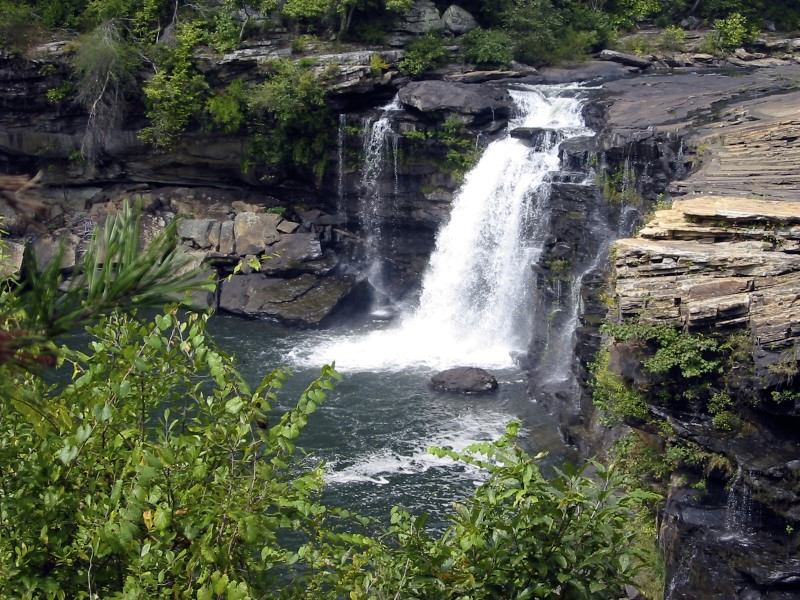
Little River Falls

- Phenix City Waterfall: in Lakewood Park, Phenix City
- Piney Branch Falls: Marshall County Note: Private property. Permission must be sought.
- Pisgah Gorge Falls: Also called Little Bryant Creek Waterfalls. Upper, middle, and lower waterfalls in the Pisgah Civitan Park. Difficulty is 7 out of 10 for the first two falls. Free-fall and cascading falls. Close access to the third falls is not advised. Note: Reports of "No trespassing" signs now.
- Quarter Creek Falls:
- Rainbow Falls: Dismals Canyon in Franklin County. Privately owned preserve designated a National Natural Landmark.
- Salt Creek Falls: Gaylesville.
- Seven Falls: The falls are cascading tiers off Burney Mountain road, on Seven Falls Creek in Bankhead National Forest, near Falkville in Morgan County. Note: Falls are on the private property of a hunting club. Permission should be obtained.
- Shangri-La Falls:
- Little River Falls. Little River Canyon Falls Park.
- Short Creek Falls:
- Sougahoagdee Falls:
- Thompson Falls, in Marshall County.
- Turkey Foot Falls. Sipsey Wilderness Waterfalls.
- Upper Caney Creek Falls: Bankhead National Forest.
- Upper White Creek Falls - Valentine Pool.
- Walls of Jericho Falls: Walls of Jericho Canyon, Jackson County.
- Welcome Falls:
- Welti Falls: In Cullman County.
- Wetumpka Falls:
- Wildflower Trail waterfall; Huntsville.
- Wilson Dam Waterfall:
- Yellow Creek Falls: Cherokee County, Alabama

== Alabama waterfall loop ==
The Alabama waterfall loop is a group of waterfalls that can be visited in a single road trip:

- Pisgah Gorge Falls
- DeSoto Falls
- Indian Falls
- Little River Falls
- Noccalula Falls
- High Falls
- Piney Branch Falls: Permission needed.

== See also ==
- List of waterfalls
