= Ken Kifer =

American sport cyclist (1945–2003)

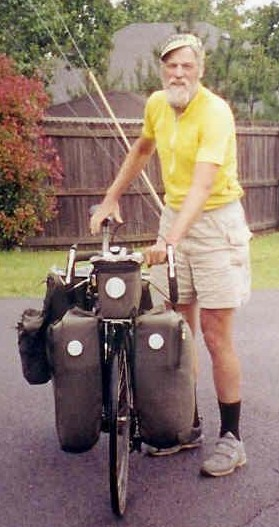
- Kifer on a tour in 2003
- Born: October 23, 1945; Pittsburgh, Pennsylvania
- Died: September 14, 2003 (aged 57); Alabama
- Occupation: English instructor
- Known for: Cycling, Walden

Ken Kifer (October 23, 1945 – September 14, 2003) was an American writer, bicyclist and webmaster. Kifer was a Walden scholar and admirer of Henry David Thoreau, and wrote Analysis and Notes on Walden. His website is still a source of information on bicycling and especially bicycle touring.

Kifer was killed by a drunk driver in September 2003 while riding his bicycle 6 miles (9.7 km) from his home near Scottsboro, Alabama, USA.

== Biography ==
Kifer was born in Pittsburgh to Paul and Dorothy Kifer and moved to Gadsden, Alabama in 1954. He attended Jacksonville State University and was a fan of caving. A keen cyclist, Kifer went on many long and short tours, many of which he chronicled on his website, and several that he did not, including one to the west coast of the United States that took him through Montana.
