= Scottsboro High School =

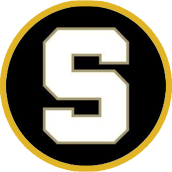

Location
- 25053 John T. Reid Parkway; Scottsboro, Alabama 35768; United States; 34°40′22″N 86°00′10″W

Information
- Former name: Jackson County High School
- Type: Public
- Motto: Maximizing the learning of all students
- Established: 1913 (113 years ago)
- School district: Scottsboro City School District
- CEEB code: 012395
- NCES School ID: 010294001147
- Principal: Jeff Tubbs
- Teaching staff: 44.00 (on an FTE basis)
- Grades: 9–12
- Enrollment: 734 (2023–2024)
- Student to teacher ratio: 16.68
- Colors: Black and Vegas gold
- Athletics: Baseball, basketball, bowling, cheerleading, football, golf, softball, cross country, track and field, swimming, wrestling, soccer, and tennis, Marching band, Color guard, Danceline
- Mascot: Wildcats
- Website: shs.scottsboroschools.net

Scottsboro High School is a public institution located in Scottsboro, Alabama.

== History ==
Scottsboro High School was originally established as Jackson County High School in 1913. In 1957, the school's name was changed from Jackson County High School to Scottsboro High School.

== Notable people ==
- Kenneth Carter – Rhode Island politician
- Robert E. Jones Jr. – Former and last member of House of Representatives from Alabama's 8th congressional district
- Eugene Harris, basketball coach and player
- Mike Kirkland, member of the Alabama House of Representatives
- Pat Trammell – University of Alabama football player and Heisman Trophy finalist
- Bo Nix - NFL quarterback for the Denver Broncos
