= Doreen Costa =

American politician

Member of the Rhode Island House of Representatives from the 31st district
- In office January 5, 2011 – January 3, 2017
- Preceded by: Kenneth Carter
- Succeeded by: Julie Casimiro

Personal details
- Born: Rhode Island
- Party: Republican
- Education: Community College of Rhode Island (did not graduate)
- Profession: Businessperson & state representative

Doreen Marie Costa is an American politician who represented District 31, which includes Exeter and North Kingstown, in the Rhode Island House of Representatives from 2011 until 2017. She was first elected in November 2010, and she served as deputy minority whip during her tenure in the Rhode Island House of Representatives.

In the wake of the March 22, 2014, resignation of Gordon Fox as Speaker of the House of Representatives and subsequent leadership shakeup, Representative Costa was appointed Vice Chairwoman of the House Judiciary Committee.

Costa graduated from Johnston High School, and attended Community College of Rhode Island.

Costa did not run for reelection to the Rhode Island House of Representatives in 2016. She kept her promise to serve no more than three terms in the state legislature. Instead, she ran successfully for the North Kingstown Town Council. Costa was succeeded by Julie Casimiro (Democrat, District 31) in the Rhode Island House of Representatives.

In 2013, Costa, a North Kingston resident, advocated for the recall of the Exeter town council over a firearm background check rule that would allow electronic background checks to be facilitated by the state. Exeter did not have the resources to conduct the checks and relied on the state. The recall failed, ultimately, costing the town of Exeter close to $10,000.
