= Woodville, Alabama =

- Town
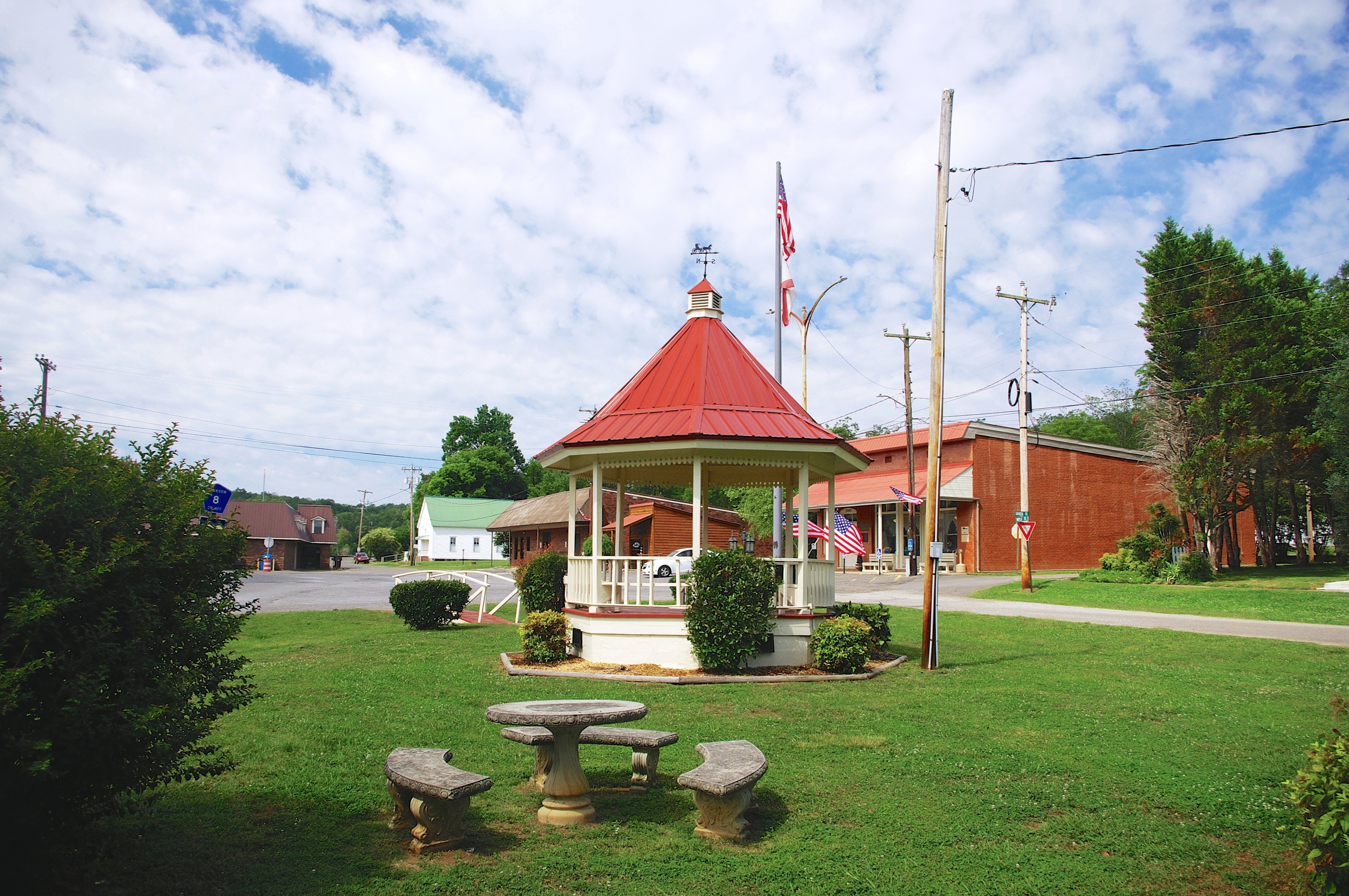
- Woodville

- Location of Woodville in Jackson County, Alabama.
- Coordinates: 34°37′36″N 86°16′29″W
- Country: United States
- State: Alabama
- County: Jackson

Government
  - Mayor: Victor Taylor

Area
  - Total: 6.66 sq mi (17.25 km^{2})
  - Land: 6.62 sq mi (17.15 km^{2})
  - Water: 0.039 sq mi (0.10 km^{2})
- Elevation: 620 ft (189 m)

Population (2020)
  - Total: 746
  - Density: 112.6/sq mi (43.49/km^{2})
- Time zone: UTC-6 (Central (CST))
  - Summer (DST): UTC-5 (CDT)
- ZIP code: 35776
- Area code: 256
- FIPS code: 01-83664
- GNIS feature ID: 0129219
- Website: www.townofwoodville.net

Woodville is a town in Jackson County, Alabama, United States. It was officially established by an act of the Alabama State Legislature on December 13, 1819, one day before Alabama became a state. It was later incorporated on May 12, 1890, but lost its charter in 1897. It re-incorporated in 1912. As of the 2010 Census, the population of the town is 746, down from 761 in 2000. According to the 2020 Census, the population held steady at 746.

== History ==
Woodville was settled about 1815 by Henry Derrick and is the oldest town in Jackson County. It was named for early residents Richard and Annie Wood. Woodville became the seat of Decatur County, Alabama in December 1821, but was attached to Jackson County when Decatur County was abolished the following year. The surrounding area was the site of considerable guerrilla warfare and small actions during the American Civil War, including the Skirmish at Paint Rock Bridge.

== Geography ==
Woodville is located at 34°37′36″N 86°16′29″W (34.626775, -86.274832). The town is situated along State Route 35, with an older section of town lying a few blocks west of SR 35 along County Road 8, facing the railroad tracks. U.S. Route 72, which intersects SR 35 in the southern part of Woodville, connects the town with Scottsboro to the east and Huntsville to the west. The Cumberland Plateau rises just north of Woodville, and the Paint Rock River passes just to the west. The Fern Cave National Wildlife Refuge lies to the northwest.

According to the U.S. Census Bureau, the town has a total area of 6.7 square miles (17 km^{2}), all land.

== Demographics ==
Historical population
Census	Pop.	Note	%±
1880	221		—
1920	191		—
1930	196		2.6%
1940	183		−6.6%
1950	165		−9.8%
1960	196		18.8%
1970	322		64.3%
1980	609		89.1%
1990	687		12.8%
2000	761		10.8%
2010	746		−2.0%
2020	746		0.0%
U.S. Decennial Census; 2013 Estimate

According to the 2020 United States Census, Woodville had a population of 746, the same as reported in the 2010 Census, indicating no population growth over the decade. The town covers a total area of 6.62 square miles (17.14 km^{2}), resulting in a population density of approximately 112.7 inhabitants per square mile (43.5/km^{2}). While detailed 2020 racial demographics are not included in the summary dataset, the town has historically been predominantly White, with the 2000 Census reporting the racial makeup as 96.98% White, 1.71% Native American, and 1.32% from two or more races.

As of the census of 2000, there were 761 people, 301 households, and 232 families residing in the town. The population density was 113.7 inhabitants per square mile (43.9/km^{2}). There were 322 housing units at an average density of 48.1 per square mile (18.6/km^{2}). The racial makeup of the town was 96.98% White, 1.71% Native American, 0.13% Asian, and 1.18% from two or more races. 0.92% of the population were Hispanic or Latino of any race.

There were 301 households, out of which 32.2% had children under the age of 18 living with them, 63.5% were married couples living together, 10.6% had a female householder with no husband present, and 22.9% were non-families. 22.3% of all households were made up of individuals, and 11.6% had someone living alone who was 65 years of age or older. The average household size was 2.53 and the average family size was 2.92.

In the town, the population was spread out, with 24.4% under the age of 18, 8.9% from 18 to 24, 29.0% from 25 to 44, 23.8% from 45 to 64, and 13.8% who were 65 years of age or older. The median age was 36 years. For every 100 females, there were 87.0 males. For every 100 females age 18 and over, there were 90.4 males.

The median income for a household in the town was $35,000, and the median income for a family was $37,426. Males had a median income of $27,946 versus $17,292 for females. The per capita income for the town was $15,796. About 9.7% of families and 11.5% of the population were below the poverty line, including 11.5% of those under age 18 and 20.5% of those age 65 or over.
