= Comer Bridge =

Bridge in Alabama, US

B. B. Comer Bridge
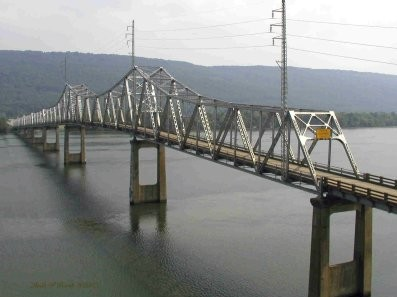
- Coordinates: 34°38′29″N 85°58′39″W
- Carries: SR 35
- Crosses: Tennessee River

Characteristics
- Design: Warren Through Steel Truss
- Total length: 2,143 ft
- Width: 19.7 ft

History
- Constructed by: Kansas City Bridge Company for the Alabama State Bridge Corporation
- Opened: 1931
- Closed: April 29, 2016

Statistics
- Daily traffic: 8,150 (2009)
- Toll: lifted 1936

Alabama Register of Landmarks and Heritage
- Designated: October 31, 2013

Location
- Interactive map of B. B. Comer Bridge

The B. B. Comer Bridge, was a two-lane, 2,143-foot (653 m) long, Warren truss bridge spanning the Tennessee River along Alabama State Route 35 in Scottsboro, Alabama. The bridge was named after Alabama governor Braxton Bragg Comer, who served from 1907 to 1911. The Kansas City Bridge Company constructed the bridge for the Alabama State Bridge Corporation. Its construction commenced in 1929 and was complete by 1931. As of 2013, this was the only remaining bridge of the 15 memorial toll bridges constructed by the Alabama State Bridge Corporation.

By 2007, the ageing structure was classified by the Alabama Department of Transportation as being a structurally deficient bridge with an overall rating of 7.7 out of 100. replacement bridge construction commenced in October 2007 and is expected to be completed in late 2015. As of April 2016, the replacement is several months away from completion. The Comer Bridge was scheduled to be demolished in 2015 although preservation efforts are underway and the Comer Bridge Foundation has been organized. In April 2013, the bridge was named one of the top ten "Top Rated Unique Savable Structures" by BridgeHunter.com. On October 31, 2013, the B. B. Comer Bridge was added to the Alabama Register of Landmarks and Heritage. On April 29, 2016, the bridge closed to all traffic with the opening of the new bridge. Crews began removing the road deck immediately after closure. Demolition of the original span began in June 2016 and was completed in July. A pyramid-shaped sculpture built from the steel of the north entrance of the bridge was installed at Scottsboro High School in May 2018 as a monument to the bridge.

== See also ==
- List of crossings of the Tennessee River
