= Little River Canyon Rim Parkway =

Coordinates: 34°22′22.1″N 85°41′29.6″W

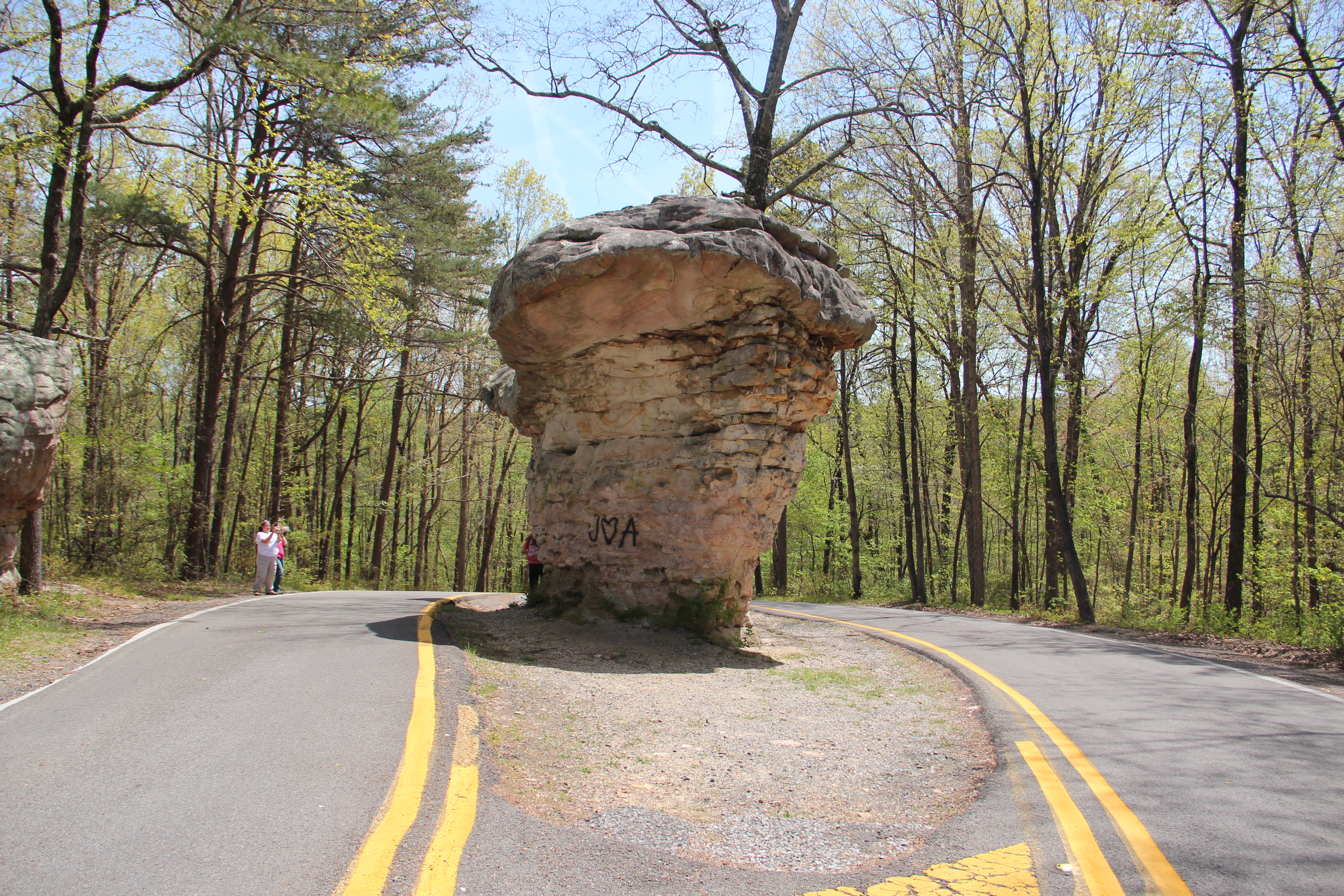
The Mushroom Rock, a landmark located in the middle of the parkway

Little River Canyon Rim Parkway, also known as Alabama State Route 176, Dekalb County Road 148 and Cherokee County Road 275, forms a 22-mile (35 km) scenic drive following the 16-mile-long (26 km) Little River Canyon National Preserve in northeastern Alabama. The highway was first designated in 1972 as State Route 275, but was later renumbered to State Route 176 on the northern portion east of former Dekalb County Road 81 and turned back south of former Dekalb County Road 81 in September 1980.

As one of Alabama's most scenic attractions, the highway itself is only well-maintained on the state portion. The turned back portion, which was highly substandard previously, fell into serious disrepair under local control, almost to the point of abandonment. On the small part of the section maintained by Dekalb County, the road is less than two lanes wide. In Cherokee County, the road widens to two narrow lanes, but has miles of broken pavement and potholes. The roadway is also characterized by extremely steep grades both at the Johnnies Creek tributary and where the roadway descends from Lookout Mountain to the Canyon Mouth Park. While the State Route 176 portion has less severe grades, it is designed similarly with sharp curves and a couple sharp dropoffs at the edge of the canyon in some areas.

In terms of scenery and attractions, not only does the route cross many seasonal tributaries, but also it has many lookout points, smaller canyons such as Bear Creek, Dees Branch and Johnnies Creek, and a view of the state's highest waterfall, Grace's High Falls. Halfway along the route at Eberhardt Point, the highway passes by the site of Canyonland Amusement Park, an abandoned and mostly demolished park that featured a chairlift into the canyon floor. The existence of Canyonland Amusement Park was the likely reason that the original State Route 275 was created. This was especially notable, because a sign for the park (painted over, but with a Coca-Cola logo) was originally placed in an island in the middle of the road entrance on the southern terminus. Another point of interest is the Canyon Mouth Park, where Little River leaves the canyon just before entering Lake Weiss.

The state portion of the parkway received asphalt for the first time in 2004 (all of the parkway was originally paved with tar and gravel).
