= Kenneth Carter (politician) =

American politician (1933–2017)

Member of the Rhode Island House of Representatives from the 31st district
- In office 5 January 1993 – 4 January 2011
- Succeeded by: Doreen Costa

Personal details
- Born: September 9, 1933 Scottsboro, Alabama
- Died: January 7, 2017 (aged 83) Saunderstown, Rhode Island
- Party: Democratic
- Spouse: Sylvia A. Clark
- Children: Kenneth, Michael, Mitchell, and Matthew
- Profession: Restaurateur

Kenneth Carter (September 9, 1933 – January 7, 2017) was an American politician. A member of the Democratic Party, he served in the Rhode Island House of Representatives, representing the 31st District from 1993 to 2011. Carter died on January 7, 2017, in Saunderstown, Rhode Island.

== Birth ==
Kenneth Carter was born in Scottsboro, Alabama on September 9, 1933.

== Family ==
Carter was married to Sylvia Clark and together they had four children named Kenneth, Michael, Mitchell, and Matthew.

== Personal life and community involvement ==
Carter served in the U.S. Navy during the Korean War and owned several restaurants in Narragansett. He owned and operated Carter's 19th Hole, a bar/restaurant located at the North Kingstown Golf Course on Quonset Point. He also ran the Shriner's Hall in North Kingstown.

== Education ==
Carter graduated from Jackson County High School in Alabama, where he served as Class President.

== Politics ==
Kenneth Carter represented District 31 in the Rhode Island House of Representatives from 1993 until 2011. He lost reelection on November 2, 2010, to Republican challenger Doreen Costa, by a margin of 54.2 percent to 45.8 percent. This election coincided with a Republican wave nationally.

Carter was remembered by colleagues, including Costa, for his fairness and civility.

During the 2009-2010 sessions, he served on the House Committee on Finance, and served as Chairman of the House Committee on Veterans Affairs.

=== Political experience ===
Carter has had the following political experience:

- Candidate, Rhode Island House of Representatives, District 31, 2010
- Representative, Rhode Island State House of Representatives, 1992-2010
- Delegate, Rhode Island Constitutional Convention, 1986

=== Caucuses/Non-Legislative Committees ===
Carter has been a member of the following committees:

- Crime Lab Commission
- Board of Governors, Higher Education
- North Kingstown Democratic Town Committee
- Selective Service Commission
