= Little River Falls =

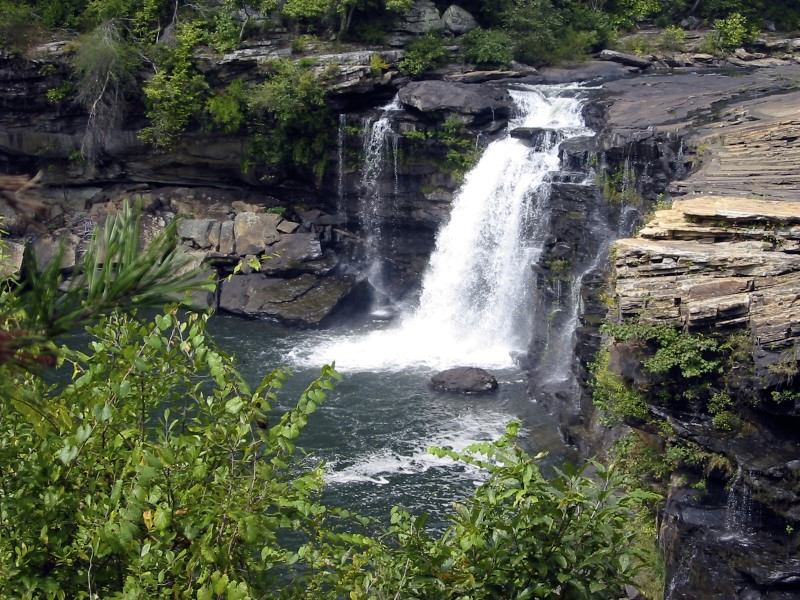
- Little River Falls in the Little River Canyon
- Interactive map of Little River Falls
- Location: Cherokee County & DeKalb County, Alabama, United States
- Coordinates: 34.395278°N 85.627313°W
- Type: Cascade
- Total height: 45 feet (14 m)
- Watercourse: Little River

Little River Falls is located within the Little River Canyon National Preserve in Alabama, United States. It marks the beginning of the Little River Canyon. On April 8, 2014, the falls set a record water flow of more than 11,000 cubic feet per second. This broke the old record set in 1964.

== See also ==
- List of waterfalls
- List of waterfalls in Alabama
