= Mike Kirkland (politician) =

American politician

Member of the Alabama House of Representatives from the 23rd district
- Incumbent
- Assumed office November 9, 2022
- Preceded by: James Hanes

Personal details
- Born: Jackson County, Alabama
- Party: Republican
- Spouse: Pamela
- Children: 2
- Education: Athens State University (BA); University of North Alabama (MBA)

Mike Kirkland is an American politician who has served as a Republican member of the Alabama House of Representatives since 2022. He has represented Alabama's 23rd House district since the election on November 8, 2022.

== Biography ==
Kirkland graduated from Scottsboro High School. He obtained a Bachelor of Arts from Athens State University and a Master of Business Administration from the University of North Alabama. He and his wife Pamela are Baptists. They have 2 children and 3 grandchildren. He has worked at a company called Vulcan Materials for 30 years.

Alabama House of Representatives
Preceded by James Hanes	Member of the Alabama House of Representatives; 2022–present	Succeeded by incumbent
