= DeSoto State Park =

State park in Alabama, United States

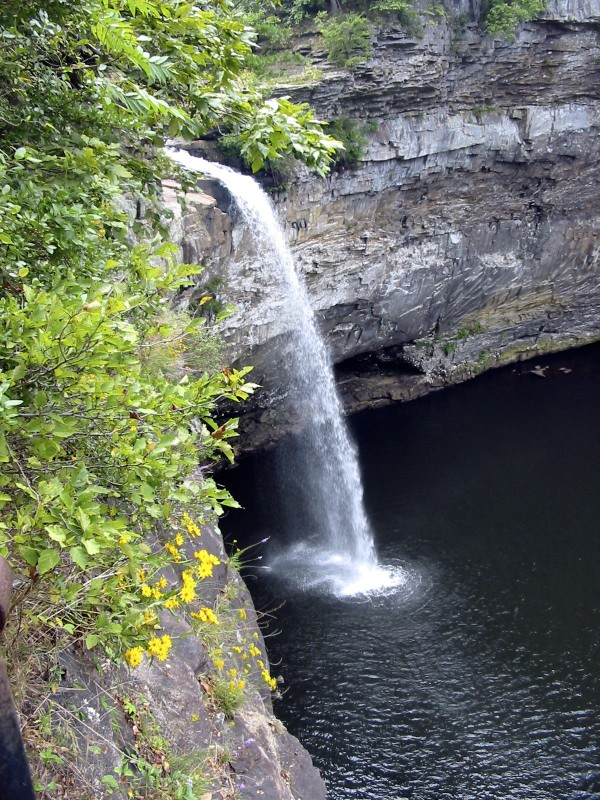
- DeSoto Falls

- Location within Alabama
- Interactive map of DeSoto State Park
- Location: Cherokee and DeKalb counties, Alabama, United States
- Coordinates: 34°32′54″N 85°35′24″W
- Area: 3,502 acres (1,417 ha)
- Elevation: 1,614 ft (492 m)
- Established: 1935
- Administrator: Alabama Department of Conservation and Natural Resources
- Website: Official website

DeSoto State Park is a public recreation area located on Lookout Mountain, eight miles (13 km) northeast of Fort Payne, Alabama. The state park covers 3,502 acres (1,417 ha) of forest, rivers, waterfalls, and mountain terrain. It borders the Little River, which flows into the nearby Little River Canyon National Preserve. The 104-foot-tall (32 m) DeSoto Falls, the state's highest waterfall, is found in a separate part of the park six miles (9.7 km) north of the main park.

== History ==
The park, which bears the name of 16th-century explorer Hernando de Soto, was developed in the 1930s by the Civilian Conservation Corps. The park then known as State Park No. 5 was established in 1935. When it was dedicated as Desoto State Park on May 24, 1939, it was the largest state park in Alabama. The park's museum celebrating the CCC's work in Alabama state parks opened in 2013.

== Awards ==
In September 2020, DeSoto State Park was one of eleven Alabama state parks awarded Tripadvisor’s Traveler’s Choice Award, which recognizes businesses and attractions that earn consistently high user reviews.

== Activities and amenities ==
The park features 25 miles (40 km) of hiking trails that include more than 11 miles (18 km) of National Recreation Trail-designated mountain bike trails, a CCC-built lodge and cabins, restaurant, campsites, chalets, motel, swimming pool, and nature center.
