= DeSoto Falls (Alabama) =

Coordinates: 34.55°N 85.59°W

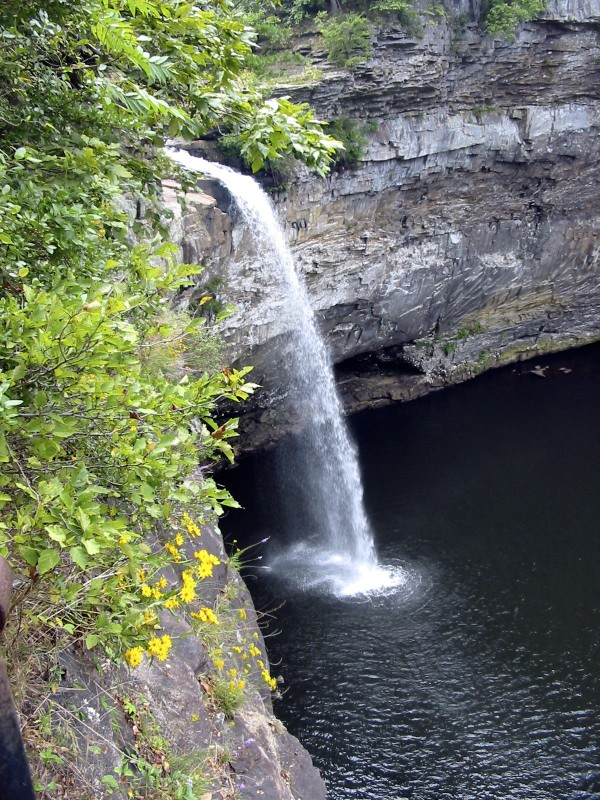
- Interactive map of DeSoto Falls
- Location: Alabama, United States
- Type: Plunge
- Total height: 104 feet (31.70 m)
- Number of drops: 1
- Watercourse: Little River

DeSoto Falls is a 104-foot (32 m) waterfall located on the West Fork of the Little River near Mentone, Alabama, United States, in DeSoto State Park. The falls have carved their own small canyon. They are named after Spanish explorer Hernando de Soto.

DeSoto Falls is a destination for extreme kayakers who paddle over the falls.

== See also ==
- List of waterfalls
- List of waterfalls in Alabama
