= Grace's High Falls =

Waterfall in Alabama, United States

Coordinates: 34.3578°N 85.6774°W

Grace's High Falls is a seasonal waterfall in the US state of Alabama, in Little River Canyon National Preserve. The waterfall is Alabama's highest at 133 feet.

== See also ==
- List of waterfalls
- List of waterfalls in Alabama
