= Alabama State Route 275 =

State highway in Alabama, United States

State Route 275

Route information
- Maintained by ALDOT
- Length: 8.250 mi (13.277 km)
- Existed: 1990–yes

Major junctions
- North end: SR 21 in southwestern Talladega
- SR 77 north of Talladega
- South end: SR 21 northeast of Talladega

Location
- Country: United States
- State: Alabama
- Counties: Talladega

Highway system
- Alabama State Highway System; Interstate; US; State
← SR 273	→ SR 277

State Route 275 (SR 275) was a 8.250-mile (13.277 km) numbered state highway in Alabama. The route was a western and northern bypass route of Talladega. Commissioned in 1990, SR 275 was the second incarnation of what was originally the designation for the entire Little River Canyon Rim Parkway. SR 275 has been deleted in favor of the designation of bypass as SR 21.
