= Scottsboro, Alabama =

City in Alabama, United States

- City
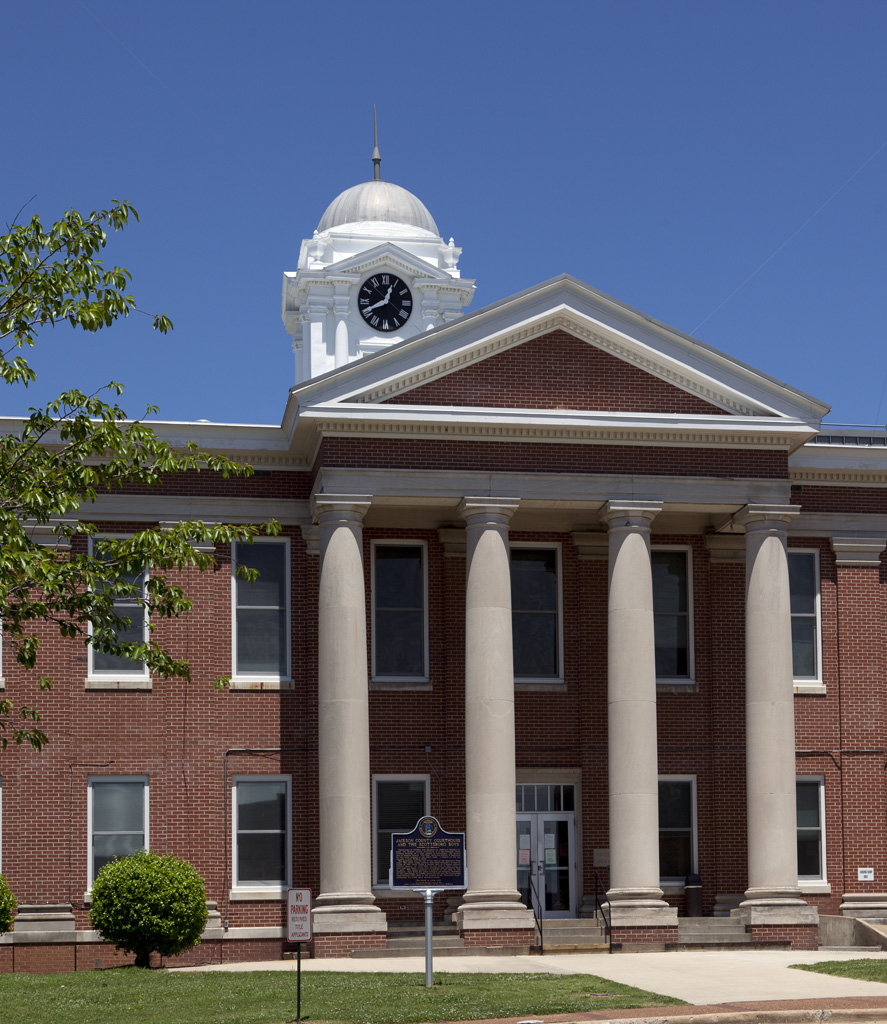
- Jackson County Courthouse in Scottsboro
- Motto: "Someplace Special"
- Location of Scottsboro in Jackson County, Alabama.
- Coordinates: 34°39′5″N 86°2′33″W
- Country: United States
- State: Alabama
- County: Jackson
- Established: 1850

Government
  - Type: Mayor Council
  - Mayor: Jim McCamy

Area
  - Total: 57.40 sq mi (148.67 km^{2})
  - Land: 50.65 sq mi (131.17 km^{2})
  - Water: 6.76 sq mi (17.50 km^{2})
- Elevation: 690 ft (210 m)

Population (2020)
  - Total: 15,578
  - Density: 307.6/sq mi (118.76/km^{2})
- Time zone: UTC-6 (Central (CST))
  - Summer (DST): UTC-5 (CDT)
- ZIP codes: 35767-35768
- Area code: 256
- FIPS code: 01-68736
- GNIS feature ID: 0154493
- Website: cityofscottsboro.com

Scottsboro is a city in and the county seat of Jackson County, Alabama, United States. The city was named for its founder Robert T. Scott. As of the 2020 census, the population of the city is 15,578.

From its incorporation in 1870 until 1890, it was the largest community in Jackson County, losing the distinction from 1900 to 1920 to Bridgeport, but reclaiming the title in 1930 and holding it since that time. It is 30 miles each from the state boundaries of Georgia to the east (Dade County) and Tennessee to the north, about 45 miles from Huntsville, Alabama to the west and about 55 miles from Chattanooga, Tennessee to the northeast.

The city was the namesake of the Scottsboro Boys case, which is one of the most important civil rights cases in the history of American jurisprudence.

== History ==
=== Early history ===
Prior to Scottsboro's founding, the area surrounding the present-day city was inhabited by the Cherokee Indians. While the Tennessee Valley did not have large Native American settlements at the time of the first white settlers, there was a Cherokee town named "Sauta" near where Scottsboro developed along the Tennessee River.

As settlers began pouring into the eastern Tennessee region, chiefly from the Upper South, they found the Tennessee River to be an excellent source of food, water, transportation and trade. Around 1805, one of the first white settlers in the area, John Hunt, built a cabin near a large spring in what would become Huntsville. The town was formally incorporated in 1811. Huntsville (Madison County's seat, later the Alabama state capital and today the state's largest city) would be home to the Mississippi Territory land office where much of Jackson County would be partitioned and sold after the Cherokee ceded their lands.

More settlers moved into the Mississippi Territory, resulting in the statehood of Mississippi in 1817, and the creation of the Alabama Territory that same year. On December 13, 1819, Jackson County was created by an act of the Alabama Legislature. One day later, the State of Alabama was admitted into the Union as the 22nd state on December 14, 1819.

The first county seat of Jackson County was at Sauta, a former native town, near present-day Scottsboro. Early county meetings were held in Sauta cave. Sauta did not survive after the courthouse was moved to Bellefonte in 1821.

Since Bellefonte had better access to the Tennessee River than Sauta, more settlers started moving to the area. They were also attracted by it being the county seat.

Scottsboro's founder, Robert Thomas Scott, served in the Alabama Legislature for almost 20 years and later ran a hotel in Bellefonte.

Since he and his wife, Elizabeth, wanted a place to call their own and were not very fond of Bellefonte, they moved to what would become Scottsboro around 1850–53. The town was called Scottsville, Scott's Mill, or Sage Town until 1868. In 1853, the newly formed Memphis and Charleston Railroad, which ran from Memphis, Tennessee, to Stevenson, Alabama (with connections to Charleston, South Carolina), decided to build a station at Scottsboro and did so in 1857. In the same year, the M&C railroad initiated passenger service at Scott's Station.

Bellefonte citizens rejected the railroad because they did not want train travel to interfere with the town's thriving river trade. In addition, its low riverside land was not suitable for tracks.

In 1861/1863, the Bellefonte courthouse was set ablaze and charred. The area was heavily damaged during the U.S. Civil War.

Selection of the new county seat had already begun in 1860 with a contest to see which towns were suitable. Many of the county's towns pushed for their selection, but the leading candidates were Hollywood, Stevenson, Larkinsville, and Scotts-borough (Scottsboro). To narrow consideration, the county council decided that:

- The town must be within 8 miles (13 km) of the Memphis & Charleston Railroad (the rising form of transportation).
- The town must be near the center of the county.

The second requirement eliminated Stevenson and Larkinsville, and the county commissioners ultimately selected Scottsboro as the county seat. This led to the rapid decline of Bellefonte, which also suffered from no railroad access. Courthouse construction began in 1868 with the jail following two years later. County commissioners sited the courthouse at its current location in the public square.

On January 20, 1870, Scottsboro was incorporated by the Alabama Legislature. A. Snodgrass was the first mayor. Scottsboro got its first telegraph office in 1872.

The 20th century brought great changes to Scottsboro. In 1902, two cases of smallpox were found but the disease did not spread more widely. In 1903, the first car that came to the town drove through the square en route from Ohio to Florida. In 1906, local blacksmith H.C. Payne built Scottsboro's first homemade automobile, which was made with a wooden frame, four sprocket wheels and hand-powered cranks. In 1911, the courthouse was set ablaze and was rebuilt. In 1912, the courthouse was demolished and an election was held to determine whether the courthouse would be moved to Stevenson or stay in Scottsboro (some Stevenson residents did not think Scottsboro deserved the role of county seat). Scottsboro won the vote and the present courthouse was built (It was later renovated and expanded in 1954.)

=== The Scottsboro Boys ===
The Scottsboro Boys case was among the most important civil rights cases in the history of American jurisprudence. It was twice appealed to the United States Supreme Court and established the principles that, in the United States, criminal defendants are entitled to effective assistance of counsel and that people may not be de facto excluded from juries due to their race.

In 1931 nine black youths, ranging in age from twelve to twenty, were accused of raping two white females, Victoria Price and Ruby Bates (who later recanted her accusation). The two females, several other white males and the accused alike had all hitched rides on a westbound Southern Railway freight train coming from Chattanooga on March 25, 1931. The white males reported to a nearby train master that they had been attacked by a group of blacks and forced off the train. Shortly thereafter, the authorities stopped the train at Paint Rock, Alabama, and arrested the black youths. Bates and Price accused the black youths of rape. The defendants were taken to Scottsboro, the seat of Jackson County.

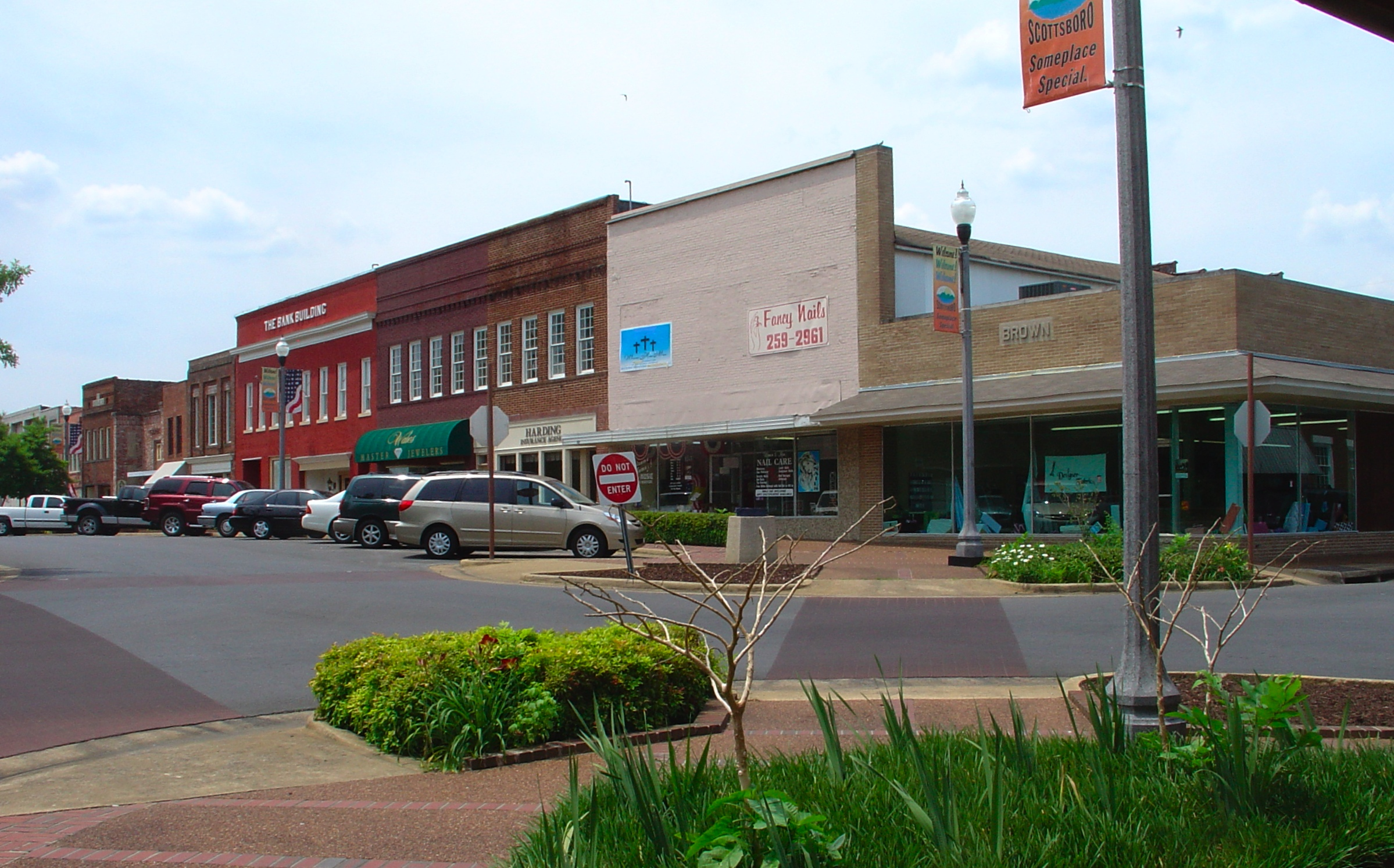
Street in front of court house where crowd gathered

During the course of four trials, most of the defendants were convicted and sentenced to death by all-white juries, although witnesses provided weak and contradictory testimonies. The case is now widely regarded (including in Scottsboro) as one of the worst travesties of justice perpetrated against blacks in the post-Reconstruction South. Only the first trials were held in Scottsboro. Of the original nine young black defendants (some of them minors at the time of arrest), accused of gang raping two fellow hobo white females on a freight train, eight were quickly convicted and sentenced to death by all-white juries in trials occurring in a mob atmosphere in Scottsboro.

The only two local attorneys who were willing to take the cases had few qualifications for criminal defense work. They were unable to put up much of a defense when the judge gave them no time to prepare their defenses before the trials. He started the first trial as soon as they agreed to take the cases, and then began each case as soon as the jury had gone out on the previous one.

In its two reviews of appeals from the case, the United States Supreme Court overturned their death sentences and convictions, saying that the convictions had been obtained by improper procedures. Those convicted spent at few as six years and as many as nineteen years incarcerated in harsh local jails and state prisons. The Scottsboro Boys had served long prison sentences when Governor George Wallace partially mitigated this widely accepted injustice by issuing a pardon in 1976 for the one remaining Scottsboro defendant still living.

"In January, 2004, amidst television cameras and radio and newspaper reporters, a crowd gathered near the Jackson County Court House in Scottsboro to dedicate a historical marker commemorating the Scottsboro Boys' trial and their struggle for justice." "An 87-year-old black man who attended the ceremony, one of the few who could remember the cases firsthand, recalled that the mob scene following the Boys' arrest 'was frightening' and that death threats were leveled against the jailed suspects. He applauded the town's move to install the plaque on the courthouse yard. 'I think it will bring the races closer together,' he said, 'to understand each other better.'"

The Scottsboro Boys Museum and Cultural Center opened in this city in February 2010.

=== Modern history ===
In 1900, Scottsboro was home to about 1,000 residents.

Beginning in 1908, a ferry began transporting passengers and automobiles to and from Sand Mountain. From 1928–1931, the Kansas City Bridge Company built the B. B. Comer Bridge, a 2,143-foot (653 m) long steel bridge that connected the county seat to Sand Mountain, almost tripling the town's population. The bridge entered use in July 1930. By 2007, the aging structure was classified by the Alabama Department of Transportation as being a structurally deficient bridge with an overall rating of 7.7 out of 100. Construction of a replacement bridge commenced in October 2007, and was completed by 2016. In 1932, a couple were wed on top of the bridge. The newlywed wife commented, "I wanted to be married where the light-blue water touches and meets with the light-blue sky…" In the 1980s, a second bridge was built to improve travel and reduce traffic on the old bridge. The 1930s B.B. Comer Bridge bridge was demolished in 2016.

In 1913, the city purchased approximately 30 acres (12 ha) for a water system on Sand Mountain. The first electric lights in Scottsboro became operational on January 21, 1916. Scottsboro's first hospital was established in 1923.

In 1927, aviator Charles Lindbergh performed stunts in his plane The Spirit of St. Louis. In 1932, Scottsboro officially became a "city" when an act of the Alabama Legislature bestowed that title on towns with more than 2,000 inhabitants. Scottsboro's population at the time was about 2,304.

By 1954, the courthouse had started to deteriorate. It was renovated. and all the wooden walls were replaced with marble. Because of the growth in population and demand, more rooms were added to expand offices for services such as automobile tags and land records.

Since the early 1980s to the late 2000s, Scottsboro has seen substantial population growth as the economy moved away from its rural, agrarian past to a more diversified one. Real estate in a small town environment and competitive state business tax rates both appealed to newcomers who bought homes and/or commuted to jobs in Chattanooga, Huntsville and Atlanta.

== Geography ==
Scottsboro is located at 34°39′5″N 86°2′33″W (34.651368, −86.042570).

According to the U.S. Census Bureau, the city has a total area of 51.7 square miles (134 km^{2}), of which, 47.3 square miles (123 km^{2}) of it is land and 4.4 square miles (11 km^{2}) of it (8.47%) is water. The water areas are the Tennessee River and its backwaters.

The section of the Tennessee River Valley that includes Scottsboro is geologically related to the Sequatchie Valley.

== Climate ==
Scottsboro, Alabama

Climate chart (precipitation, max. and min. temperature)
J	F	M	A	M	J	J	A	S	O	N	D
6 50 28	5.2 55 31	6.5 64 38	4.5 72 45	5 80 55	4.4 87 63	4.5 90 67	3.4 90 65	4.8 84 59	3.6 74 46	5 63 37	5.7 54 31
- █ Average max. and min. temperatures in °F
- █ Precipitation totals in inches
- Source: Scottdsboro, Alabama at usclimatedata.com.
Metric conversion
J	F	M	A	M	J	J	A	S	O	N	D
153 10 −2	133 13 −1	166 18 3	115 22 7	128 27 13	111 31 17	115 32 19	87 32 18	122 29 15	92 23 8	126 17 3	144 12 −1
- █ Average max. and min. temperatures in °C
- █ Precipitation totals in mm

Climate data for Scottsboro, Alabama (1991–2020 normals, extremes 1891–present)
Month	Jan	Feb	Mar	Apr	May	Jun	Jul	Aug	Sep	Oct	Nov	Dec	Year
Record high °F (°C)	81 (27)	82 (28)	90 (32)	92 (33)	98 (37)	107 (42)	109 (43)	107 (42)	108 (42)	100 (38)	88 (31)	80 (27)	109 (43)
Mean daily maximum °F (°C)	50.4 (10.2)	54.8 (12.7)	63.3 (17.4)	72.1 (22.3)	79.5 (26.4)	86.4 (30.2)	89.1 (31.7)	89.1 (31.7)	84.4 (29.1)	74.3 (23.5)	62.6 (17.0)	53.5 (11.9)	71.6 (22.0)
Daily mean °F (°C)	39.8 (4.3)	43.3 (6.3)	51.0 (10.6)	59.1 (15.1)	67.4 (19.7)	75.2 (24.0)	78.4 (25.8)	77.8 (25.4)	72.1 (22.3)	60.9 (16.1)	49.8 (9.9)	42.8 (6.0)	59.8 (15.4)
Mean daily minimum °F (°C)	29.2 (−1.6)	31.9 (−0.1)	38.6 (3.7)	46.0 (7.8)	55.4 (13.0)	64.0 (17.8)	67.7 (19.8)	66.5 (19.2)	59.8 (15.4)	47.5 (8.6)	37.0 (2.8)	32.0 (0.0)	48.0 (8.9)
Record low °F (°C)	−10 (−23)	−13 (−25)	5 (−15)	23 (−5)	31 (−1)	39 (4)	48 (9)	46 (8)	34 (1)	20 (−7)	1 (−17)	−1 (−18)	−13 (−25)
Average precipitation inches (mm)	6.07 (154)	5.72 (145)	5.69 (145)	5.04 (128)	4.55 (116)	4.62 (117)	5.17 (131)	4.05 (103)	4.26 (108)	3.56 (90)	4.76 (121)	6.20 (157)	59.69 (1,516)
Average snowfall inches (cm)	0.1 (0.25)	0.6 (1.5)	0.5 (1.3)	0.0 (0.0)	0.0 (0.0)	0.0 (0.0)	0.0 (0.0)	0.0 (0.0)	0.0 (0.0)	0.0 (0.0)	0.0 (0.0)	0.1 (0.25)	1.3 (3.3)
Average precipitation days (≥ 0.01 in)	10.1	9.7	10.5	9.0	8.6	9.7	9.6	7.7	6.6	6.5	7.9	10.2	106.1
Average snowy days (≥ 0.1 in)	0.2	0.4	0.1	0.1	0.0	0.0	0.0	0.0	0.0	0.0	0.0	0.1	0.8
Source: NOAA

== Demographics ==
Historical population
Census	Pop.	Note	%±
1870	357		—
1880	722		102.2%
1890	959		32.8%
1900	1,014		5.7%
1910	1,019		0.5%
1920	1,417		39.1%
1930	2,304		62.6%
1940	2,834		23.0%
1950	4,731		66.9%
1960	6,449		36.3%
1970	9,324		44.6%
1980	14,758		58.3%
1990	13,786		−6.6%
2000	14,762		7.1%
2010	14,770		0.1%
2020	15,578		5.5%
U.S. Decennial Census

=== 2020 census ===
As of the 2020 census, Scottsboro had a population of 15,578. The median age was 44.4 years. 20.3% of residents were under the age of 18 and 22.5% of residents were 65 years of age or older. For every 100 females there were 89.1 males, and for every 100 females age 18 and over there were 85.7 males age 18 and over.

There were 6,623 households in Scottsboro, of which 27.1% had children under the age of 18 living in them. Of all households, 45.4% were married-couple households, 16.8% were households with a male householder and no spouse or partner present, and 32.3% were households with a female householder and no spouse or partner present. About 31.9% of all households were made up of individuals and 16.0% had someone living alone who was 65 years of age or older.

There were 7,401 housing units, of which 10.5% were vacant. The homeowner vacancy rate was 1.6% and the rental vacancy rate was 11.4%. 69.3% of residents lived in urban areas, while 30.7% lived in rural areas.

Scottsboro racial composition
Race	Num.	Perc.
White (non-Hispanic)	12,981	83.33%
Black or African American (non-Hispanic)	761	4.89%
Native American	100	0.64%
Asian	130	0.83%
Other/Mixed	822	5.28%
Hispanic or Latino	784	5.03%

=== 2010 census ===
As of the census of 2010, there were 14,770 people, 6,245 households, and 4,141 families residing in the city. The population density was 285.5 inhabitants per square mile (110.2/km^{2}). There were 7,039 housing units at an average density of 136.2 per square mile (52.6/km^{2}). The racial makeup of the city was 89.8% White, 4.6% African American, .8% Native American, 0.8% Asian, 0.2% Pacific Islander, 2.0% from other races, and 1.8% from two or more races. 3.5% of the population were Hispanic or Latino of any race.

There were 6,245 households, out of which 25.6% had children under the age of 18 living with them, 49.6% were married couples living together, 12.6% had a female householder with no husband present, and 33.7% were non-families. 30.8% of all households were made up of individuals, and 14.3% had someone living alone who was 65 years of age or older. The average household size was 2.31 and the average family size was 2.86.

In the city, the population was spread out, with 21.7% under the age of 18, 7.9% from 18 to 24, 23.8% from 25 to 44, 27.7% from 45 to 64, and 18.9% who were 65 years of age or older. The median age was 42.2 years. For every 100 females, there were 90.8 males. For every 100 females age 18 and over, there were 94.4 males.

The median income for a household in the city was $36,554, and the median income for a family was $48,803. Males had a median income of $35,909 versus $25,403 for females. The per capita income for the city was $21,065. About 14.6% of families and 16.8% of the population were below the poverty line, including 23.0% of those under age 18 and 14.6% of those age 65 or over.

=== 2000 census ===
As of the census of 2000, there were 14,762 people, 6,224 households, and 4,201 families residing in the city. The population density was 311.8 inhabitants per square mile (120.4/km^{2}). There were 6,848 housing units at an average density of 144.6 per square mile (55.8/km^{2}). The racial makeup of the city was 91.11% White, 5.34% African American, 1.02% Native American, 0.54% Asian, 0.03% Pacific Islander, 0.56% from other races, and 1.42% from two or more races. 1.50% of the population were Hispanic or Latino of any race.

There were 6,224 households, out of which 28.7% had children under the age of 18 living with them, 52.5% were married couples living together, 12.0% had a female householder with no husband present, and 32.5% were non-families. 29.6% of all households were made up of individuals, and 13.1% had someone living alone who was 65 years of age or older. The average household size was 2.32 and the average family size was 2.85.

In the city, the population was spread out, with 22.8% under the age of 18, 7.7% from 18 to 24, 27.8% from 25 to 44, 25.9% from 45 to 64, and 15.7% who were 65 years of age or older. The median age was 40 years. For every 100 females, there were 88.6 males. For every 100 females age 18 and over, there were 84.5 males.

The median income for a household in the city was $32,654, and the median income for a family was $42,509. Males had a median income of $32,318 versus $21,965 for females. The per capita income for the city was $18,430. About 9.9% of families and 14.3% of the population were below the poverty line, including 19.1% of those under age 18 and 20.5% of those age 65 or over.

== Attractions ==
Scottsboro is home to the Unclaimed Baggage Center. This business sells the contents of unclaimed and undeliverable airline luggage whose owners cannot be found. The facility sells such items as electronics, clothing, and any other item that might be found in lost airline luggage. The prices are low and the offerings eclectic enough to attract visitors from other states, and even from other parts of the world who make their way to Scottsboro to see what others have lost. The Unclaimed Baggage Center has been featured several times in the media, including in The Wall Street Journal, Vogue, The Los Angeles Times, Good Morning America, The Washington Post, The Dallas Morning News, The Atlanta Journal-Constitution, The Baltimore Sun, The Seattle Times and the travel/adventure television series Globe Trekker.

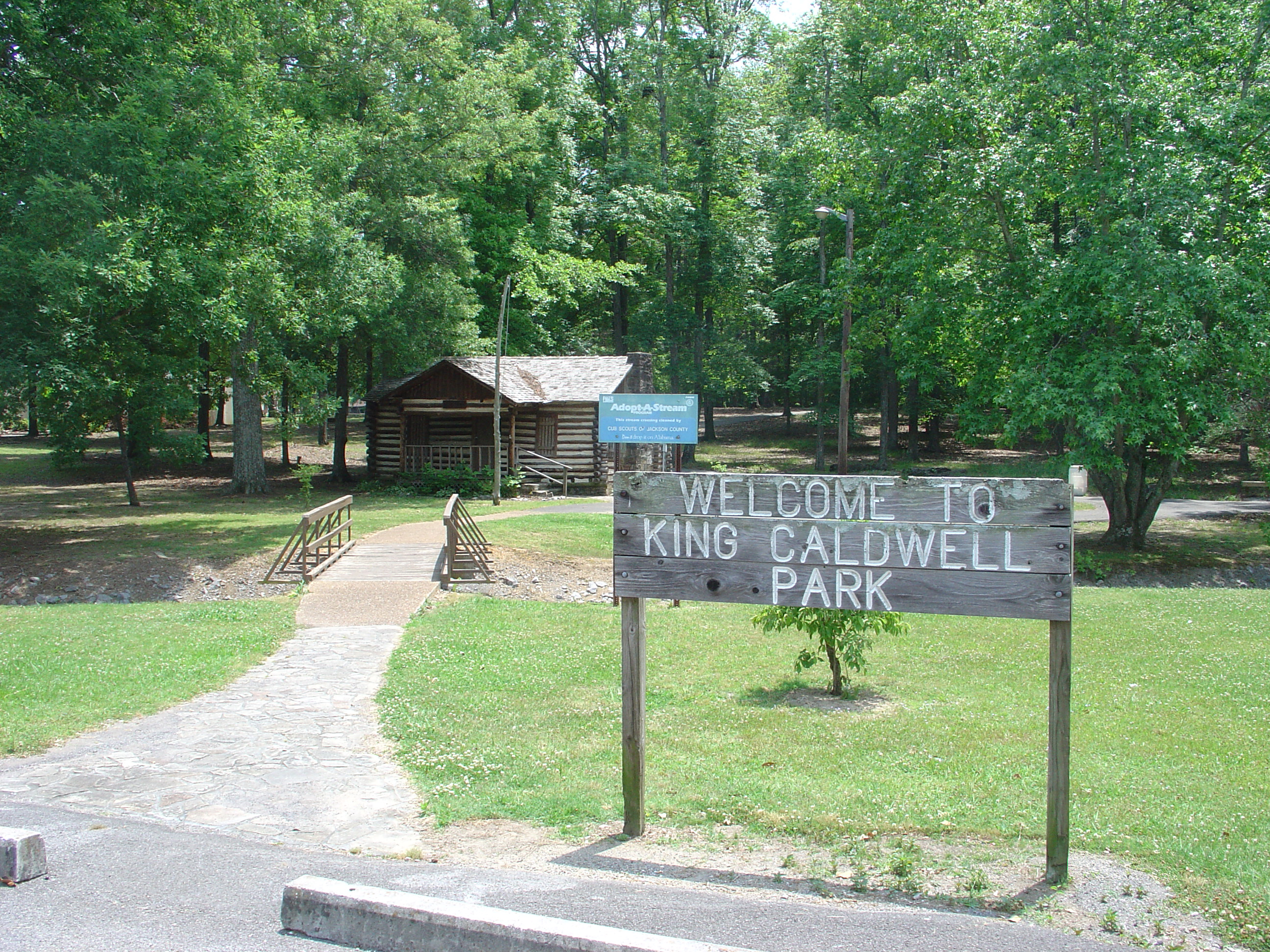
King Caldwell Park in Scottsboro

The former Memphis and Charleston Railroad depot still stands just off the courthouse square. Built in 1861, it is considered the oldest standing structure in the original city limits. During the Civil War, Union raiders and Confederate soldiers skirmished, which resulted in bullet holes in the brick walls and wooden freight doors. The structure was restored and reopened as a museum in June 2012.

First Monday has been a major draw for over one hundred years, perhaps since 1870. In the old Southern style, First Monday is a trade day (or craft show) in which people set up booths and sell homemade wares.

Payne's Soda Fountain on the courthouse square has been in business since 1869. It has been in its current location on the northwest corner of the square since 1891. The small, yet elegant, shop has a 1950s-themed design, offering sandwiches, the classic malt, and rare photographs of Scottsboro's past.

King Caldwell Park is near downtown Scottsboro, adjacent to the library and across the street from the police department. It is largely wooded, with nature trails running throughout. It offers picnic tables, a pavilion with rest rooms and a playground. It is the home of Art Sunday, an arts and crafts festival held on the Sunday before Labor Day each year. Many exhibitors and thousands of people attend the festival. King Caldwell Park is named for Scottsboro native and philanthropist David King Caldwell (1887–1977), known as "King Caldwell." He moved to Tyler, Texas, where he became an oil tycoon and founded the Caldwell Zoo. He gave generously to local causes in Scottsboro and paid for the higher education of many Scottsboro school children. He visited his namesake Caldwell School in Scottsboro and gave every child in the school a shiny new half-dollar, at a time when that was a lot of money for a child to receive.

== Development ==
The attraction of Guntersville Lake has brought in numerous real estate developers. The Goose Pond area of Scottsboro has seen recent development of communities centered around a lake-living lifestyle.

== Media ==
- The Progressive Age (also titled Scottsboro Progressive Age) (1889–1962)
- The Clarion (weekly community newspaper—15,500 subscribers across three counties)
- Jackson County Sentinel (bi-weekly newspaper)

== Health care ==
- Highlands Medical Center, a 170-bed facility

== Education ==
Scottsboro High School is the primary educational institution in Scottsboro, Alabama. Scottsboro High School was established as Jackson County High School in 1913. The name was changed to Scottsboro High School in 1957.

== Notable people ==
- Lucille Benson, actress
- Kenneth Carter, member of the Rhode Island House of Representatives
- John Allen Chau, evangelical Christian missionary
- Bob Clemens, NFL player
- Robert K. Dawson, U.S. Assistant Secretary of the Army (Civil Works) from 1985 to 1987
- Babs Hodges Deal, novelist
- William Ledbetter Heath, novelist
- Robert E. Jones, Jr., U.S. Representative from 1947 to 1977
- Ken Kifer, bicyclist and writer. Lived near Scottsboro.
- Mike Kirkland, member of the Alabama House of Representatives and resident of Scottsboro
- Pat Trammell, former University of Alabama quarterback
- Thomas E. Weatherly, Jr., poet
- Debra Webb, suspense novelist
