= Little River Canyon National Preserve =

14,000 acres in Alabama (US) managed by the National Park Service

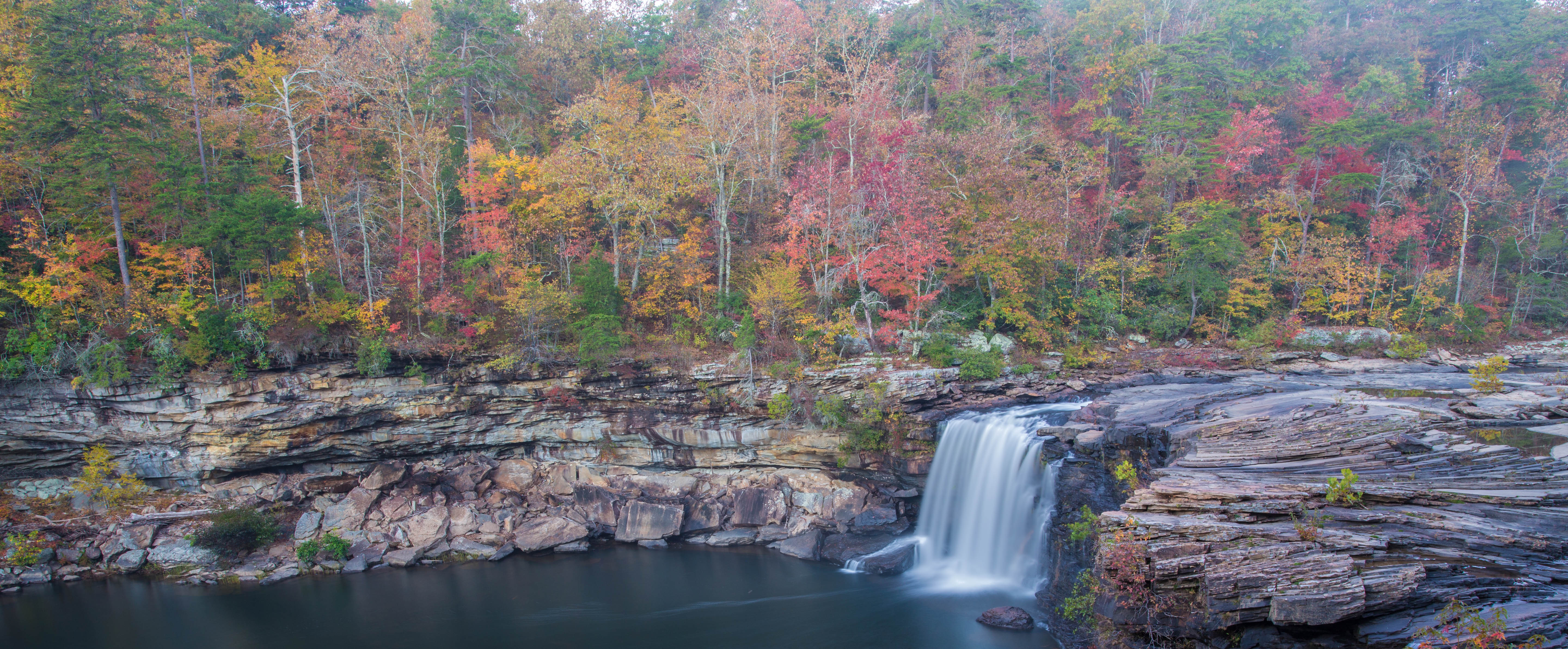
- Little River Canyon

- Location within Alabama Location within the United States
- Location: Cherokee and DeKalb County, Alabama, U.S.
- Nearest city: Fort Payne, Alabama
- Coordinates: 34°26′26″N 85°35′44″W
- Area: 15,288 acres (61.87 km^{2})
- Established: October 21, 1992
- Visitors: 726,239 (in 2022)
- Governing body: National Park Service
- Website: Little River Canyon National Preserve

Little River Canyon National Preserve is a United States National Preserve located on top of Lookout Mountain near Fort Payne, Alabama, and DeSoto State Park. Created by an Act of Congress in 1992, the 15,288-acre (6,187 ha) preserve protects what is sometimes said to be the nation's longest mountaintop river, the Little River. The canyon was historically called "May's Gulf", "gulf" being a common term throughout the Cumberland Plateau for this sort of feature. Prior to being assigned to the National Park Service, the canyon area formed the southmost unit of Alabama's DeSoto State Park.

== The river ==
The Little River flows for almost its entire length along the middle of Lookout Mountain in northeast Alabama. Over eons of geologic time, Little River has carved out one of the Southeast's deepest canyons as it winds its way from headwaters in Georgia before exiting the mountain and emptying into the Coosa River (Weiss Lake impoundment) near Leesburg, Alabama. Legend has it that a minor Civil War skirmish occurred on the rim.

The main stem of the river is formed by the confluence of the 17-mile-long (27 km) East Fork and the 25-mile-long (40 km) West Fork. The Little River flows another 23 miles (37 km) from the confluence of the forks, through the canyon, to its end at Weiss Lake.

== The canyon ==
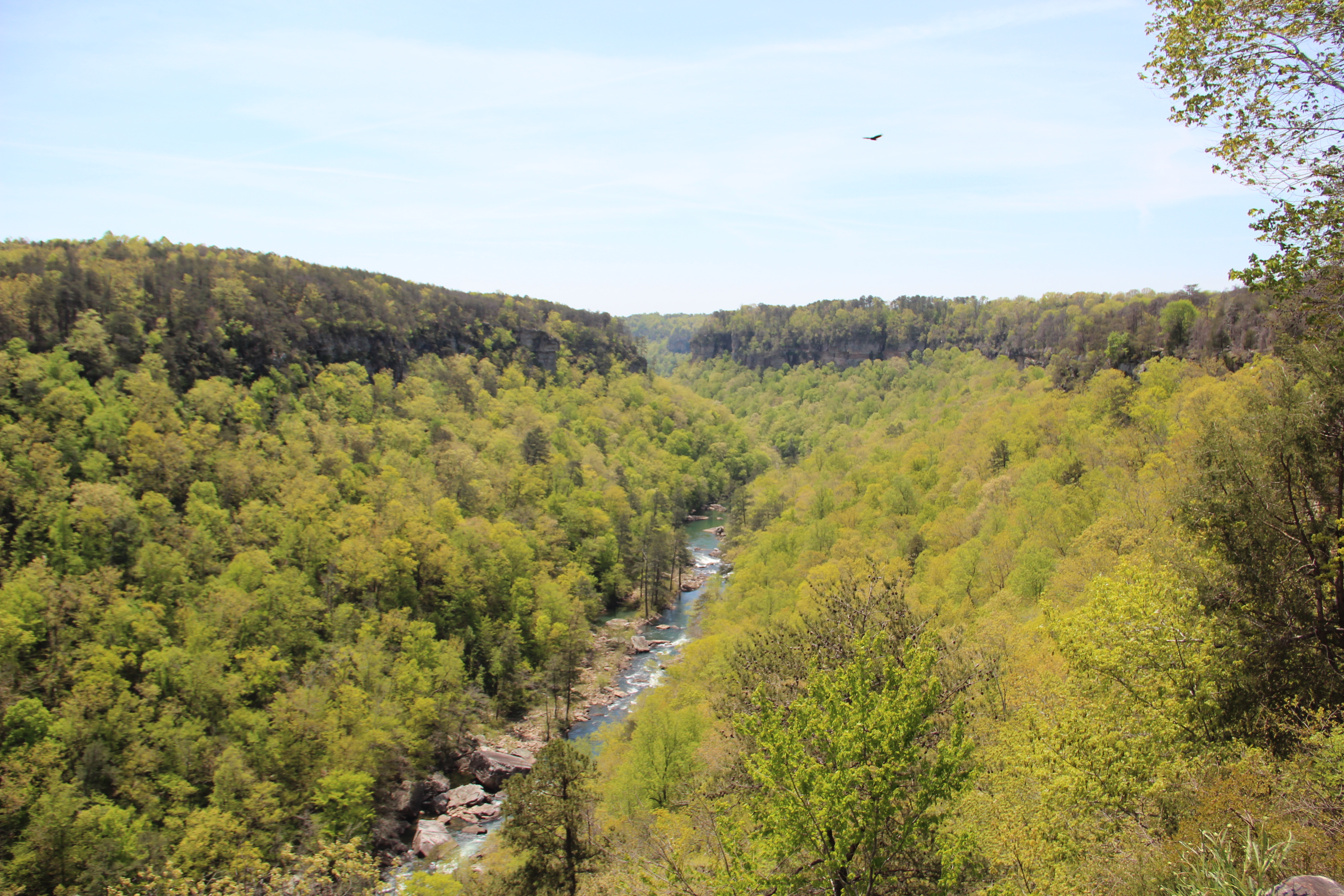
Little River Canyon

The river is said to be among the cleanest and wildest waterways in the South, undammed aside from a small and derelict hydroelectric project at DeSoto Falls on the West Fork near Mentone, Alabama. Sandstone cliffs tower up to 600 feet (180 m) above the narrow canyon floor, frequently visible from the 23-mile (37 km) scenic drive known as Little River Canyon Rim Parkway (AL 176, Dekalb C.R. 148, Cherokee C.R. 275) on the canyon's western rim. The northern half of this road was built under federal supervision in the New Deal era. The southern half was built by local authorities.

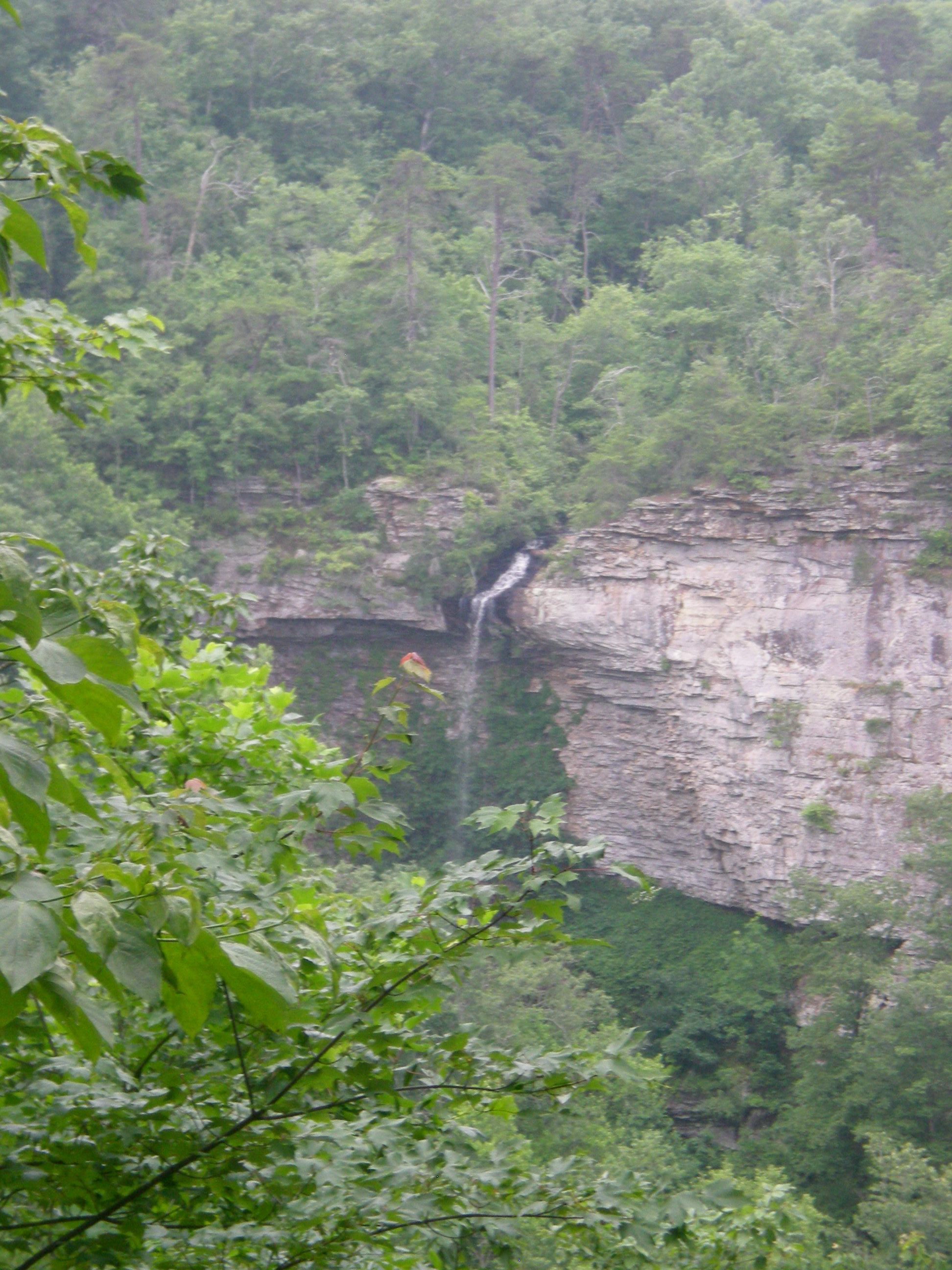
Grace's High Falls, a day after abundant rain.

The river boasts three major waterfalls: DeSoto Falls, Little River Falls (at the beginning of the canyon), and the seasonal Grace's High Falls, which falls into the side canyon created by Bear Creek and is Alabama's highest waterfall at 133 feet (41 m).

Eberhart Point, above the confluence of Bear Creek and the Little River, is the most convenient point for descents to the bottom of the canyon. Hikers may follow a rough eroded path. This is the remnant of a vehicle access-way which was constructed during the course of a ski-lift and amusement park project that the State of Alabama permitted a private consortium of Fort Payne businessmen to construct in the late 1960s. The project was abandoned after a couple of years, though visitors may still see associated debris in Pine Tree Hole, in the bottom of the canyon. An unmaintained but fairly well-defined trail proceeds approximately eight miles to the canyon mouth. Heading upstream is much more problematic and should only be undertaken by hikers accustomed to bushwhacking. The river is popular with practiced whitewater enthusiasts who are willing to carry their vessels down to Pine Tree Hole. Camping is not currently permitted in the canyon.

There are currently few visitor facilities operated by the National Park Service within the preserve. DeSoto State Park, operated by the Alabama State Park System, is located within the preserve boundaries and has a lodge, restaurant, several campgrounds, and other facilities. There is a day-use area at the mouth of the canyon where a campground was once operated. The area provides places for picnics and is a popular swimming location.

There has been little land acquisition since the New Deal era. The immediate area of the canyon is being encroached upon by real estate speculation, construction of vacation houses, and even subdivision development.

From the 1970s to the early 1980s, a mini-theme park (a commercial venture), called "Canyonland Park," operated in the park area. It included a zoo and a lift. Some of the lift pedestals are still in the park area.

== Activities ==
Backcountry camping is no longer allowed in the Little River Canyon National Preserve. Hunting in the preserve requires a hunting license from Alabama or any other state. Riding ATVs is no longer permitted. Fishing requires an Alabama fishing license and net or seine fishing are not allowed.

The Jacksonville State University Little River Canyon Center is a 23,000-square-foot (2,100 m^{2}) LEED-certified visitor center.
