= February 2025 North American storm complex =

Severe weather event in the United States

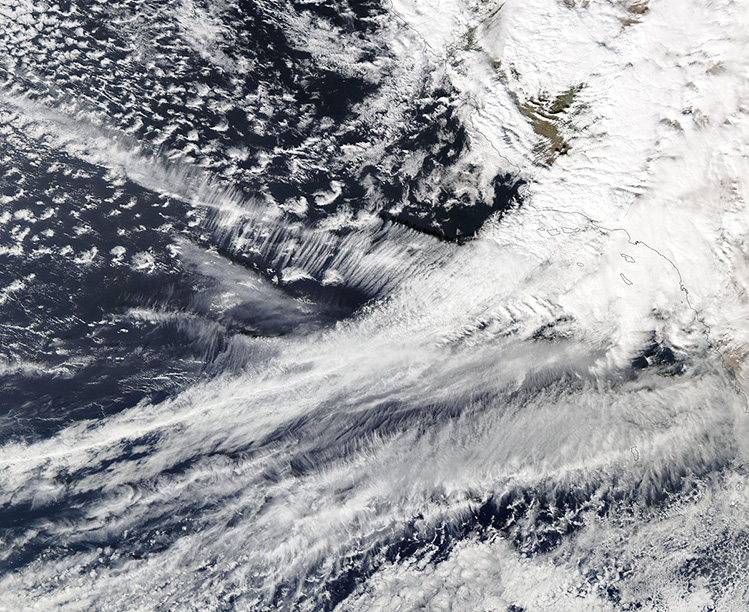
- An atmospheric river over southern California on February 13, 2025.

Winter storm
- Highest gusts: 126 mph (203 km/h) at Palisades Tahoe, California
- Max. rainfall: 10.87 in (276 mm) of rain in Manchester, California
- Max. snowfall: 55 in (140 cm) of snow at Mammoth Mountain, California

Tornado outbreak
- Tornadoes: 25
- Max. rating: EF2 tornado

Overall effects
- Fatalities: At least 19 (Kentucky: 14; West Virginia; 3; Georgia; 1, Pennsylvania; 1)
- Areas affected: California, Ohio River Valley
- Power outages: >321,000
- Part of 2024–25 North American winter, Tornadoes of 2025

From February 15–16, 2025, a storm system brought flash flooding and tornadoes that impacted parts of the United States, leaving at least 18 people dead. The flash flooding occurred in Kentucky, West Virginia, Tennessee, and Virginia.

== Impacts ==
=== Western United States ===
==== California ====
Map plotting the storm's track and intensity, according to the Saffir–Simpson scale Map key Saffir–Simpson scale Tropical depression (≤38 mph, ≤62 km/h) Tropical storm (39–73 mph, 63–118 km/h) Category 1 (74–95 mph, 119–153 km/h) Category 2 (96–110 mph, 154–177 km/h) Category 3 (111–129 mph, 178–208 km/h) Category 4 (130–156 mph, 209–251 km/h) Category 5 (≥157 mph, ≥252 km/h) Unknown Storm type Tropical cyclone Subtropical cyclone Extratropical cyclone, remnant low, tropical disturbance, or monsoon depression

Debris flows were reported near the burn scars of recent fires. A fire department vehicle was pushed into the ocean; the occupant survived with minor injuries. In Southern California, an EF0 tornado was confirmed by the National Weather Service. The tornado touched down in a trailer park, and several homes suffered severe damage. No injuries were reported.

==== Kansas ====
The 2025 CONCACAF Champions Cup game at Children's Mercy Park in Kansas City, Kansas between Sporting Kansas City and Inter Miami CF originally scheduled for February 18 was delayed to the next day due to snowfall.

=== Eastern United States ===
==== Kentucky ====
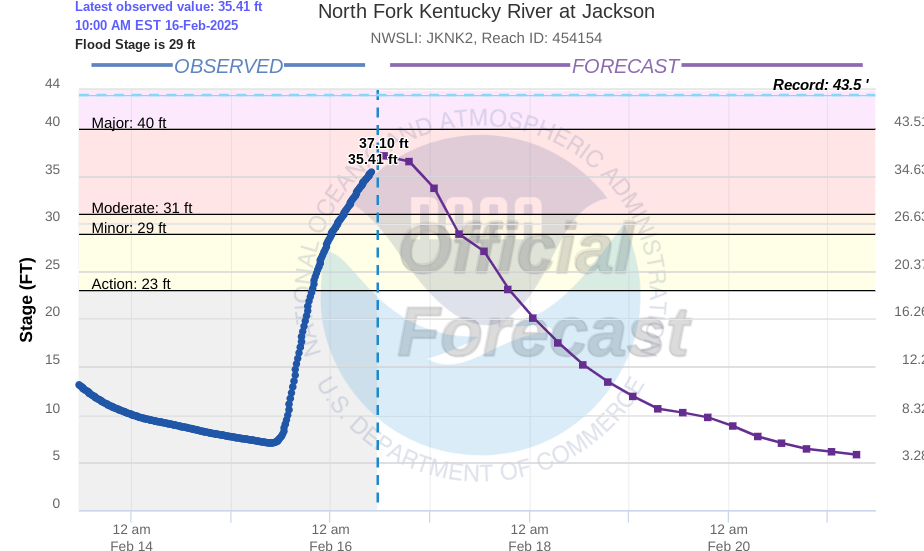
North Fork Kentucky River gauge at Jackson, Kentucky. Water crested at 37.1 feet.

Areas impacted included Kentucky, and parts of Virginia, West Virginia, and Tennessee. At least 14 people were killed in Kentucky. In Kentucky and West Virginia, governors Andy Beshear and Patrick Morrisey declared states of emergency. In Hazard, Kentucky, the North Fork Kentucky River crested at 30.52 feet (9.30 m), the worst flooding seen since 1984. Water rescues are underway in parts of Kentucky. The storm also knocked out power to over 39,000 homes in Kentucky, as the flood waters covered roadways as the North Fork Kentucky River crested 14 feet above flood stage. Beshear wrote to Donald Trump requesting an emergency disaster declaration, which was approved. Police in Pike County, Kentucky reported that the city of Pikeville was inaccessible due to flooded roadways. The Levisa Fork in Pike County crested at 46.68 feet, severely damaging Pikeville High School and homes along the river. At least three people in Pike County died during the floods.

In Kentucky, governor Andy Beshear confirmed at least 14 people were dead, and over 1,000 people were rescued from the floods. Among the deaths were a mother and child who were swept away in flood waters in Hart County, and an elderly man who attempted to drive through flood waters in Clay County. Beshear also stated that the number of fatalities is likely to rise. The 12 deaths occurred in the counties of Hart, Pike, Washington, Clay, Floyd, and Nelson. After the flooding, a winter storm brought snow and cold temperatures to Kentucky which could potentially stop recovery efforts.

==== West Virginia ====
In Southern West Virginia, governor Patrick Morrisey declared a state of emergency in 13 counties, and confirmed that there were three deaths in McDowell County and several missing persons. Major flooding on the Tug Fork and Bluestone River led to evacuations and road damage as flood waters covered roads. The flood also left more than 54,000 people without power. The West Virginia National Guard was deployed to conduct rescues. Williamson, West Virginia experienced major flooding as the Tug Fork was expected to crest at 49 feet (14.9 m), three feet above flood stage. A flood wall protected the downtown area from major damage, but other parts of the city and other areas in Mingo County had major damage. The record for Williamson is 52.6 feet (16 m). In Kermit, West Virginia, the Tug Fork was expected to crest at 51 feet (15.5 m), two feet above major flood level. More than 50 people were rescued in Mingo County. Morrisey confirmed three deaths in the state, with others still missing.

==== Tennessee and Virginia ====
In Virginia, the Virginia National Guard deployed about 55 soldiers distributed commodities in communities affected by flooding, and water rescues were underway in the Richlands area in Tazewell County, Virginia, where they rescued 51 people, 17 dogs, and 8 cats. Water rescues were also conducted in the community of Hurley, Virginia. Hurley previously suffered a disastrous flood in 2002 which nearly destroyed it. Overall, over 100 people have been rescued from high water in Southwest Virginia.

In Tennessee, residents were pressured to evacuate after flooding led to the failure of a levee on the Obion River, as over seven inches of rain caused floods in the state. Obion County mayor Steve Carr issued a mandatory evacuation order and declared a state of emergency. The National Weather Service declared a flash flood emergency for Rives, Tennessee, downstream from where the levee failed. Flood waters also covered roads and citizens were urged not to drive in flood waters.

==== East Coast ====
In Georgia, at least one person was killed in Atlanta after severe storms and heavy winds caused trees to fall and knock out power. The Clayton County jail temporarily lost power during the storm. Around 42,000 customers lost power in the Washington, D.C. metropolitan area during the storm, and the Chesapeake Bay Bridge was forced to close. Wind gusts reached 76 mph (122 km/h) at Camp David, and 59 mph (95 km/h) in Baltimore. Further north, a women was killed due to high winds in Philadelphia. The storm also led to flight delays in New York City and Boston, with significant freezing rain in New Jersey. Further north, on Mount Washington, two hikers required rescue from an avalanche. In St. Lawrence County, New York, a travel ban was enacted due to the severe weather. At Massena, wind gusts reached 53 mph (85 km/h) and blizzard conditions were reported.

=== Canada ===
The storm hit southern Ontario and Quebec on February 16, causing flight delays and cancellations at Lester B. Pearson International and Pierre Elliott Trudeau International Airports, and blanketing the region with 20 to 40 centimetres (8-16 in) of snow. Montreal and Laval reported around 40 cm (16 in) of snow, while Quebec's Eastern Townships region received 35 cm (14 in). Meanwhile, the Greater Toronto Area received 25 to 30 cm (10-12 in) of snow, Ottawa received 30 cm (12 in) and Hamilton received 32 cm (12.8 in). Schools in the Greater Montreal area announced closures, while Ontarians already had the day off due to Family Day. The weather caused a major collision involving 20 vehicles on Autoroute 20 near Drummondville, Quebec. As the storm moved east into the Maritimes, it left the region with snow, freezing rain and high wind conditions. As a result, thousands of residents of Canada's Maritime provinces were left without power on February 17.

== Confirmed tornadoes ==
Confirmed tornadoes by Enhanced Fujita rating
EFU	EF0	EF1	EF2	EF3	EF4	EF5	Total
0	7	16	2	0	0	0	25

=== February 13 event ===
List of confirmed tornadoes – Thursday, February 13, 2025 (Note: All dates are based on the local time zone where the tornado touched down; however, all times are in Coordinated Universal Time for consistency.)
EF#	Location	County / Parish	State	Start Coord.	Time (UTC)	Path length	Max width
EF0	Southeastern Oxnard	Ventura	CA	34.1618°N 119.1547°W	23:27–23:29	0.63 mi (1.01 km)	20 yd (18 m)
EF0	A high-end EF0 tornado touched down in the southeastern part of Oxnard and damaged a dozen mobile homes in two mobile home parks. Damage included shingle and roof loss, destroyed carports and metal porch roofs, toppled fences, and shattered windows. Several large tree branches were broken as well.						

=== February 15 event ===
List of confirmed tornadoes – Saturday, February 15, 2025
EF#	Location	County / Parish	State	Start Coord.	Time (UTC)	Path length	Max width
EF2	S of Bradford	Gibson	TN	36.0005°N 88.835°W	01:01–01:11	4.08 mi (6.57 km)	300 yd (270 m)
EF2	This low-end EF2 tornado crossed US-45E south of Bradford, where several homes had large sections of their roofs torn off, one of which was shifted off its foundation. A barn was destroyed and many large trees were downed, one of which landed on a house. A few mobile homes sustained minor damage shortly before the tornado lifted.						
EF1	NE of Prices Mill to ENE of Neosheo	Simpson	KY	36.6926°N 86.7157°W	03:46–03:51	4.33 mi (6.97 km)	150 yd (140 m)
EF1	This tornado initially destroyed an older garage at a farm, and sheet metal from the structure was scattered downwind and wrapped around tree branches. It then severely damaged three barns, lifting wood anchors and throwing sheet metal up to 0.25 mi (0.40 km) away. The most significant damage occurred at Sundown Stables, where a horse arena was thrown into a barn, causing major structural damage. Multiple trees were snapped or uprooted along the path.						
EF0	S of Raymond	Hinds	MS	32.1855°N 90.4122°W	04:04–04:06	2.64 mi (4.25 km)	50 yd (46 m)
EF0	Several small trees and branches were snapped by this weak tornado.						
EF1	WSW of Shannon to NW of Carolina	Lee	MS	34.0809°N 88.8233°W	04:10–04:26	16.63 mi (26.76 km)	350 yd (320 m)
EF1	A high-end EF1 tornado damaged multiple homes along its path. A few homes had large parts of their roofs removed, and one house had its carport destroyed. A mobile home was damaged and shifted off its foundation, outbuildings were damaged or destroyed, and a car was badly damaged. Many trees were downed and several power poles were snapped as well.						
EF1	NW of Carolina to SW of Beans Ferry	Itawamba	MS	34.1506°N 88.5195°W	04:27–04:34	6.62 mi (10.65 km)	300 yd (270 m)
EF1	Many trees were snapped or uprooted and the roof of a home was damaged.						
EF0	N of Clay	Itawamba	MS	34.3294°N 88.3419°W	04:39–04:40	1.03 mi (1.66 km)	75 yd (69 m)
EF0	A few trees were downed and a home had its metal roof peeled off by this high-end EF0 tornado.						
EF1	NE of Clay	Itawamba	MS	34.3323°N 88.223°W	04:45–04:47	1.41 mi (2.27 km)	200 yd (180 m)
EF1	Multiple trees were snapped or uprooted.						
EF1	SE of Vina	Franklin	AL	34.3509°N 88.077°W	04:54–05:03	6.01 mi (9.67 km)	75 yd (69 m)
EF1	A tornado touched down and moved northeast, causing major damage to the metal roof of a residence along a county highway, with a large uprooted tree falling onto the garage. It continued across SR 172 producing additional tree damage, heavily damaging the roof of a chicken house and causing minor shingle damage to a home. The tornado tracked through mainly wooded areas with scattered tree damage before lifting just west of Bear Creek.						
EF0	SSW of Russellville	Franklin	AL	34.4231°N 87.7915°W	05:12–05:15	2.89 mi (4.65 km)	75 yd (69 m)
EF0	A high-end EF0 tornado touched down, uprooting trees in its initial path. It tracked northeast, damaging the roof of a chicken house, causing minor roof damage to a single-family home, and damaging another chicken house. After crossing US 43, the tornado downed trees onto two homes, causing roof damage before lifting.						
EF1	Tuscumbia to Muscle Shoals	Colbert	AL	34.7212°N 87.7166°W	05:12–05:21	4.3 mi (6.9 km)	215 yd (197 m)
EF1	This tornado touched down in a neighborhood southwest of downtown Tuscumbia, where RE Thompson Intermediate School had its roof blown off, and many trees were downed, some of which fell onto homes and caused roof damage. As it moved through the downtown area, power lines and traffic signals were destroyed, and a building had its metal roof removed. Trees were downed on the east side of Tuscumbia before the tornado entered Muscle Shoals, snapping numerous additional trees, damaging the canopy of a gas station, and downing fences. It then tracked through residential areas in the eastern part of Muscle Shoals, causing more tree damage before lifting. This was the first of two tornadoes that struck Tuscumbia and Muscle Shoals in 2025.						
EF2	ESE of Russellville to SE of Littleville	Franklin	AL	34.4791°N 87.6587°W	05:20–05:27	3.93 mi (6.32 km)	170 yd (160 m)
EF2	A low-end EF2 tornado touched down in Franklin County and first impacted areas in and around the small community of Waco, where homes sustained partial roof loss, other houses were damaged by falling trees, and a mobile home was flipped over onto its side. Sheds and outbuildings were damaged in this area as well, and an ATV was lofted and thrown. The tornado then crossed SR 24 and moved to the northeast, where the top portion of a large silo collapsed, some outbuildings were destroyed, and many power lines and large trees were downed, some of which landed on homes and cars. A house was completely unroofed shortly before the tornado dissipated. One person was injured.						
EF1	WSW of Killen to Southern Elgin to WNW of Rogersville	Lauderdale	AL	34.841°N 87.5765°W	05:22–05:33	13.42 mi (21.60 km)	250 yd (230 m)
EF1	This tornado first touched down near Killen in the Kendale Gardens subdivision, where several trees were snapped or uprooted, including one large tree that fell onto a house, causing structural damage. It moved eastward, crossing Shoal Creek and a small section of Wilson Lake, damaging trees along its path. The tornado continued through areas on the north side of Wilson Lake, snapping more trees and causing some additional tree damage on the south side of Elgin. It then crossed Second Creek and downed some tree branches before dissipating. This was the first of three tornadoes that struck Elgin in 2025.						
EF1	ENE of Decatur to Collinsville to NW of Bailey	Newton, Lauderdale	MS	32.4735°N 89.0254°W	05:31–05:48	16.7 mi (26.9 km)	720 yd (660 m)
EF1	A tornado initially caused tree damage and peeled tin off of a barn roof upon touching down. It then intensified as it moved east, snapping trees, knocking down power poles, and inflicting roof and carport damage to homes. After crossing MS 494 into Collinsville, the tornado significantly damaged the roof of a carwash and snapped numerous trees, one of which landed on and damaged a house. It then exited Collinsville and continued toward Okatibbee Lake, uprooting trees, damaging a park station, and causing some additional minor structural damage before dissipating.						
EF1	SSW of Town Creek	Lawrence	AL	34.5487°N 87.4985°W	05:33–05:34	1.5 mi (2.4 km)	150 yd (140 m)
EF1	Farm outbuildings were damaged and trees were snapped or uprooted.						
EF1	Rogersville	Lauderdale	AL	34.8259°N 87.2898°W	05:37–05:39	0.38 mi (0.61 km)	115 yd (105 m)
EF1	A brief tornado occurred in Rogersville, where several businesses experienced minor damage to awnings, had portions of their roofs damaged, and had windows blown out. Power lines and power poles were downed, and dozens of trees were snapped or uprooted in town.						

=== February 16 event ===
List of confirmed tornadoes – Sunday, February 16, 2025
EF#	Location	County / Parish	State	Start Coord.	Time (UTC)	Path length	Max width
EF1	S of Varnado	Washington	LA	30.85°N 89.87°W	06:27–06:34	6.01 mi (9.67 km)	75 yd (69 m)
EF1	Pine trees were snapped or uprooted in a wooded area.						
EF0	Moundville	Hale	AL	32.9881°N 87.6541°W	06:33–06:36	1.62 mi (2.61 km)	150 yd (140 m)
EF0	A weak tornado touched down just west of Moundville, snapping several tree tops and branches. Upon entering Moundville, the tornado uprooted a few trees, two of which fell on and damaged houses. A barn sustained roof damage and a trampoline was also flipped. One person was injured.						
EF1	NNE of Gallion to SW of Marion	Hale, Perry	AL	32.5582°N 87.6852°W	06:52–07:10	18.37 mi (29.56 km)	200 yd (180 m)
EF1	This tornado touched down west of SR 69, causing extensive tree damage and snapping 40 to 50 power poles as it moved eastward. It intensified east of SR 25, severely damaging or destroying multiple manufactured homes and injuring two people. The tornado continued into Perry County, causing minor tree damage and destroying farm outbuildings before dissipating.						
EF1	E of Snead	Marshall	AL	34.133°N 86.3162°W	07:05–07:11	0.76 mi (1.22 km)	30 yd (27 m)
EF1	A brief tornado destroyed several barns and outbuildings and snapped trees. A power pole was also snapped, and a cattle trailer was overturned and moved several feet.						
EF0	WNW of Weogufka to SW of Mount Olive	Coosa	AL	33.0251°N 86.3541°W	08:00–08:12	12.2 mi (19.6 km)	250 yd (230 m)
EF0	Numerous trees were snapped or uprooted along the path of this tornado. Some power lines were damaged due to trees falling on them as well.						
EF1	NW of Church Hill	Tallapoosa	AL	32.6931°N 85.8422°W	08:42–08:43	1.79 mi (2.88 km)	100 yd (91 m)
EF1	Multiple trees were snapped or uprooted south of SR 50.						
EF1	NNE of Cecil to NE of Cross Keys	Macon	AL	32.3484°N 85.9745°W	08:47–08:54	7.52 mi (12.10 km)	450 yd (410 m)
EF1	This high-end EF1 tornado damaged the roofs of several outbuildings and homes. Numerous trees were also snapped and uprooted.						
EF0	NNE of Hogansville to SW of Grantville	Troup	GA	33.22°N 84.89°W	09:25–09:27	1.48 mi (2.38 km)	75 yd (69 m)
EF0	The roof of a barndominium was torn off and tossed into trees. Several trees were also snapped and uprooted.						
EF1	SSW of Worthville to WSW of Prospect	Butts, Newton, Jasper	GA	33.38°N 83.93°W	10:16–10:23	6.72 mi (10.81 km)	200 yd (180 m)
EF1	Numerous trees were snapped or uprooted by this tornado, including one that fell onto and severely damaged a home. Several other houses lost portions of their roofs or sustained damage from falling trees. A business along SR 36 suffered roof damage, and the tornado's path overlapped with an area still recovering from an EF2 tornado in 2023. The tornado weakened near the end of its path, causing sporadic tree damage before lifting.						

== See also ==
- Tornadoes of 2025
- Weather of 2025
