= Itawamba (disambiguation) =

Itawamba may refer to one of the following:

- Levi Colbert, a Chickasaw leader who was called Itte-wamba Mingo, meaning bench chief.
- Itawamba County, Mississippi
- Itawamba Community College
- Itawamba County School District
- 2010 Itawamba County School District prom controversy
- Fulton-Itawamba County Airport
