= County Route 364 (Jasper County, Georgia) =

Highway in western Jasper County, Georgia, United States

County Road 364
- Jackson Lake Road

Route information
- Maintained by Jasper County Public Works
- Length: 10.4 mi (16.7 km)
- Existed: 1984 (Note: As CR 364.)–present
- History: Previously known as SR 221 (1939–1984)

Major junctions
- South end: SR 16 west of Monticello
- SR 212 in Hardy's Crossroads
- North end: SR 11 / Monticello Crossroads Scenic Byway in Prospect

Location
- Country: United States
- State: Georgia
- County: Jasper

Highway system
- Georgia State Highway System; Interstate; US; State; Special
← US 221	SR 221	→ SR 222

County Route 364 (CR 364), locally known as Jackson Lake Road, is a 10.4-mile-long (16.7 km) road located in western Jasper County, Georgia, United States. The road gets its name from the Jackson Lake.

== Route description ==
CR 364 begins at an intersection with State Route 16 (SR 16) west of Monticello. It then passes through Smith's Mill 0.8 miles (1.3 km) north of that intersection. 1.8 miles (2.9 km) north of Smith's Mill, CR 364 has an intersection with Cook Road (CR 129). 0.8 miles (1.3 km) north-northwest of the CR 129/CR 364 intersection, it then has an intersection with Eagle Drive. CR 364 then has intersections with Holman Road in Mechanicsville, Whippoorwill Road south-southeast of Turtle's Cove, and SR 212 in Hardy's Crossroads before reaching its northern terminus at SR 11/Monticello Crossroads Scenic Byway in Prospect.

== History ==
State Route 221
- Jackson Lake Road
- Location: Jasper County
- Length: 10.4 mi (16.7 km)
- Existed: 1939–1984

In 1939, SR 221 was established from SR 16 west of Monticello to SR 11 in Prospect. A decade later, the entire highway had completed grading, but was not surfaced. Between 1957 and the end of 1960, the entire length was paved. The highway remained virtually unchanged for the next two decades. In 1984, SR 221 was decommissioned and downgraded as CR 364.

== Major intersections ==
Location	mi	km	Destinations	Notes
	0.0	0.0	SR 16 – Monticello, Jackson	Southern terminus
Hardy's Crossroads	6.3	10.1	SR 212 – Monticello, Jackson, Atlanta	
Prospect	10.4	16.7	SR 11 / Monticello Crossroads Scenic Byway (Maddox Street) – Monticello, Mansfield	Northern terminus
1.000 mi = 1.609 km; 1.000 km = 0.621 mi
