= Monticello Crossroads Scenic Byway =

Scenic route in Georgia, United States

Monticello Crossroads Scenic Byway

Route information
- Maintained by GDOT
- Length: 29.0 mi (46.7 km)
- Component highways: SR 11 from the southeastern city limits of Monticello to the Jasper–Newton county line; SR 83 from the southwestern city limits of Monticello to the Jasper–Morgan county line

SR 11 section
- Length: 15.0 mi (24.1 km)
- South end: SR 11 at the southwestern city limits of Monticello
- Major intersections: SR 16 / SR 83 / SR 212 in Monticello
- North end: SR 11 at the Jasper–Newton county line south-southwest of Mansfield

SR 83 section
- Length: 14.0 mi (22.5 km)
- South end: SR 83 at the southwestern city limits of Monticello
- Major intersections: SR 11 / SR 16 / SR 212 in Monticello; SR 142 in Shady Dale
- North end: SR 83 at the Jasper–Morgan county line northeast of Shady Dale

Location
- Country: United States
- State: Georgia
- County: Jasper

Highway system
- Georgia State Highway System; Interstate; US; State; Special
← US 11	SR 11	→ SR 11E
← SR 82	SR 83	→ US 84

Monticello Crossroads Scenic Byway is a 29.0-mile-long (46.7 km) scenic route located in the central part of the U.S. state of Georgia. It travels through pine forests and hilly agricultural land in Jasper County. It includes sections of State Route 11 (SR 11) and SR 83 north from Monticello. The routes were used by Native Americans and evangelist Methodist circuit riders. The byway passes through the Monticello Historic District and travels past several buildings on the National Register of Historic Places.

== Route description ==
The byway utilizes the entire length of SR 11 from Monticello to the Jasper–Newton county line and SR 83 from Monticello to the Jasper–Morgan county line.

=== SR 11 ===
The SR 11 segment of the byway begins at the southeastern city limits of Monticello and travels to the north-northwest. It makes its way into downtown, where it has an intersection with SR 16/SR 83/SR 212 at the southeastern corner of the town's square. The four routes are concurrent for one block (the northeastern corner of the square), where the eastbound lanes of SR 16/SR 212 depart the concurrency. However, since the square is a one-way road, the westbound lanes of SR 16/SR 212 continue the concurrency to the northwestern corner of the square. At this point, the northbound lanes of SR 11 depart the square and the concurrency. The route travels in a winding pattern to the northwest and leaves Monticello. SR 11 continues to the northwest, passing northeast of the Monticello Sky Ranch Airport. After a brief dip to the west, the route curves to a north-northwestern direction. In Eudora, it meets the northern terminus of what used to be SR 221. The route then bends to the north-northeast and reaches its northern terminus at the Newton County line.

=== SR 83 ===
The SR 83 portion of the byway begins at the southwestern city limits of Monticello and travels to the northeast. It makes its way into downtown, where it intersects SR 11/SR 16/SR 212 at the southwestern corner of the town's square. The four routes are concurrent for one block (the southeastern corner of the square), where SR 11's southern lanes depart the concurrency. However, since the square is a one-way road, SR 11's northern lanes continue the concurrency to the northeastern corner of the square. Here, SR 16's and SR 212's eastbound lanes depart the concurrency and SR 83 departs the square and the concurrency. SR 83 then leaves Monticello, passing the Hunter Pope Country Club, and continues to travel to the northeast. On the way, the route has an intersection with SR 142 in Shady Dale. Shortly after, it reaches its northern terminus at the Morgan County line.

=== National Highway System ===
The Monticello Crossroads Scenic Byway is not part of the National Highway System, a system of roadways important to the nation's economy, defense, and mobility.

== Major intersections ==
SR 11

Location	mi	km	Destinations	Notes
Monticello	0.0	0.0	SR 11 south – Gray	Southern terminus of the byway's SR 11 segment
Monticello	0.8	1.3	SR 16 west (Forsyth Street) / SR 83 south / SR 212 west (West Washington Street) – Jackson, Forsyth, Stewart	Southern end of SR 16/SR 83/SR 212 concurrency, at the southeastern edge of town square, on one-way street
Monticello	0.8	1.3	SR 16 east (East Greene Street) / SR 212 east / SR 83 north (North Warren Street) – Eatonton, Milledgeville, Madison	Northern end of SR 16/SR 83/SR 212 concurrency, at the northeastern edge of town square, on one-way street
Monticello	0.8	1.3	SR 16 east / SR 83 north / SR 212 east (West Greene Street) – Eatonton, Madison, Milledgeville	Southern end of SR 16/SR 83/SR 212 concurrency, at the southeastern edge of town square, on one-way street
Monticello	0.9	1.4	SR 16 west / SR 83 south / SR 212 west – Eatonton, Milledgeville, Madison	Northern end of SR 16/SR 83/SR 212 concurrency, at the northeastern edge of town square, on one-way street
Jasper–Newton county line	15.0	24.1	SR 11 north – Mansfield	Northern terminus of the byway's SR 11 segment
1.000 mi = 1.609 km; 1.000 km = 0.621 mi: Concurrency terminus

SR 83

Location	mi	km	Destinations	Notes
Monticello	0.0	0.0	SR 83 south – Forsyth	Southern terminus of the byway's SR 83 segment
Monticello	1.0	1.6	SR 11 north (Forsyth Street) / SR 16 west / SR 212 west (West Washington Street) – Covington, Jackson, Stewart	Southern terminus of the byway's SR 83 segment; southern end of SR 11/SR 16/SR 212 concurrency, at the southwestern edge of town square, on one-way street
Monticello	1.0	1.6	SR 11 south (East Washington Street) – Gray	Northern end of SR 11 concurrency, at the southeastern edge of town square, on one-way street
Monticello	1.1	1.8	SR 16 east / SR 212 east (East Greene Street) – Eatonton, Milledgeville	Northern end of SR 11 concurrency, at the northeastern edge of town square, on one-way street
Shady Dale	9.9	15.9	SR 142 (Covington Highway/Eatonton Highway) – Covington, Eatonton	
Jasper–Morgan county line	14.0	22.5	SR 83 north – Madison	Northern terminus of the byway's SR 83 segment
1.000 mi = 1.609 km; 1.000 km = 0.621 mi: Concurrency terminus

== See also ==
- National Register of Historic Places listings in Jasper County, Georgia (lists places on the National Register of Historic Places)
