= Gladesville (disambiguation) =

Gladesville may refer to:

- Gladesville, New South Wales, Australia
- Gladesville, Georgia, United States
- Gladesville, West Virginia, United States

== See also ==
- Gladeville, Tennessee
