= Jerry Wilburn =

American politician (1940–2026)

Member of the Mississippi House of Representatives
- In office 1964–1980

Personal details
- Born: September 18, 1940 Mantachie, Mississippi, U.S.
- Died: January 13, 2026 (aged 85) Tupelo, Mississippi, U.S.
- Occupation: Businessman, farmer

Edwin J. "Jerry" Wilburn (September 18, 1940 – January 13, 2026) was an American politician in the state of Mississippi. He served in the Mississippi House of Representatives from 1964 to 1980. He was an alumnus of Itawamba Community College. Wilburn died on January 13, 2026, at the age of 85.
