= Wheeling, Mississippi =

- Ghost town
- Location within Mississippi Location within the United States
- Coordinates: 34°08′27″N 88°22′44″W
- Country: United States
- State: Mississippi
- County: Itawamba
- Elevation: 246 ft (75 m)
- Time zone: UTC-6 (Central (CST))
  - Summer (DST): UTC-5 (CDT)
- GNIS feature ID: 706280

Wheeling is a ghost town located in Itawamba County, Mississippi.

Established in the early 19th century following the sale of the Chickasaw lands, Wheeling was a port on the Tombigbee River, located "a few miles below" the village of Van Buren. Wheeling had a hotel and merchants, though "its life was very short", and Van Buren absorbed its businesses.

The former settlement is today covered by forest, located on the east bank of the Tennessee–Tombigbee Waterway.
