= Randy Phillip Boyd =

Republican politician

Randy Boyd

Member of the Mississippi House of Representatives from the 19th district
- Incumbent
- Assumed office January 2012
- Preceded by: Mark DuVall

Personal details
- Born: Randy Phillip Boyd; March 23, 1954 (age 72) Russellville, Alabama, U.S.
- Party: Republican
- Education: Mississippi State University
- Occupation: Businessman

Randy Phillip Boyd (born March 23, 1954) is a Republican politician who has served since 2012 as a member of the Mississippi House of Representatives for the 19th District in Mantachie in northeastern Mississippi.

Boyd graduated from Tremont High School in rural Tremont in Itawamba County, Mississippi and then attended Itawamba Community College in Fulton. He graduated from Mississippi State University at Starkville.

For more than three decades, he has been engaged in the forestry industry and is a partner in LandTree LLC. He resides in Mantachie in Itawamba County.

In 2018, Boyd was among several representatives who were in opposition to introducing a state lottery in Mississippi. He is a member of the state's task force on education.
