= Jasper County High School (Georgia) =

High school in Monticello, Georgia, United States

Location
- 14477 Highway 11; Monticello, Georgia; United States; 33°20′11″N 83°42′51″W

Information
- Type: Public
- School district: Jasper County School District
- Principal: Ken Belle
- Teaching staff: 45.90 (FTE)
- Grades: 9 to 12
- Enrollment: 753 (2023-2024)
- Student to teacher ratio: 16.41
- Colors: Purple and silver
- Mascot: Purple Hurricanes
- Website: https://jchs.jasper.k12.ga.us/

Jasper County High School is a high school in Monticello, Georgia, United States. The modern school was built in 2007 .

== Notable alumni ==
- Ulysses Norris, former NFL player
- Odell Thurman, former NFL player

== See also ==
- Monticello High School (Monticello, Georgia)
