= Rara avis =

Rara avis is a Latin phrase for 'rare bird'.

Rara avis may refer to:

- Rara Avis, Mississippi, an American ghost town
- Rara Avis, an artwork by Ralph Helmick
- Rara avis, a 2005 exhibition about Iris Apfel
- RARA AVIS, a musical ensemble featuring Ken Vandermark
- Rara Avis, a 1985 documentary about Bridget Bate Tichenor

== See also ==
- Black swan theory
- Satire VI by Juvenal, containing the line: rara avis in terris nigroque simillima cygno, 'a rare bird in the lands, and very like a black swan'
