= Mantachie, Mississippi =

- Town
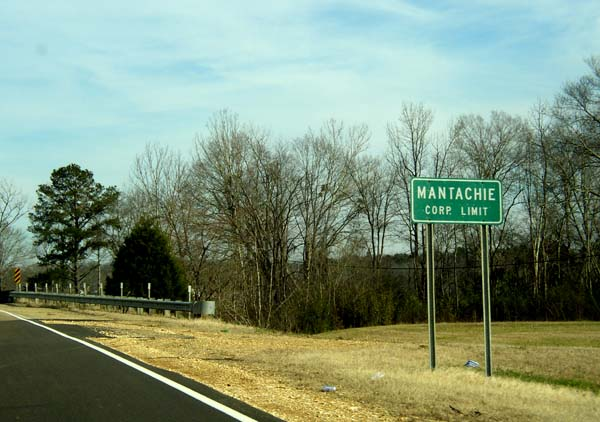
- Corporate limits on SR 371

- Location of Mantachie, Mississippi

- Location in the United States
- Coordinates: 34°19′08″N 88°30′12″W
- Country: United States
- State: Mississippi
- County: Itawamba

Area
  - Total: 4.32 sq mi (11.18 km^{2})
  - Land: 4.31 sq mi (11.15 km^{2})
  - Water: 0.012 sq mi (0.03 km^{2})
- Elevation: 318 ft (97 m)

Population (2020)
  - Total: 1,121
  - Density: 260.5/sq mi (100.57/km^{2})
- Time zone: UTC-6 (Central (CST))
  - Summer (DST): UTC-5 (CDT)
- ZIP code: 38855
- Area code: 662
- FIPS code: 28-44920
- GNIS feature ID: 2406090
- Website: mantachie.itawambams.com

Mantachie is a town in Itawamba County, Mississippi, United States. The population was 1,121 in the 2020 census. It is located 14 miles (23 km) northeast of Tupelo at the intersection of Mississippi Highways 363 and 371 and 5 miles (8 km) north of Interstate 22.

== History ==
The town began as a crossroads store owned and operated by Woods Pearce. Near Mantachie on the old Jacinto Road was the largest Chickasaw village in this section of the state. Mantachie was named for one of the Chickasaw chiefs, Man-ta-chee. Most of the Chickasaws left the village after the Treaty of Pontotoc Creek was signed in 1832.

== Geography ==
Mantachie is located in western Itawamba County. Mantachie Creek, a south-flowing tributary of the Tombigbee River, runs past the west side of the town.

According to the United States Census Bureau, Mantachie has a total area of 3.9 square miles (10.2 km^{2}), of which 0.01 square miles (0.03 km^{2}), or 0.29%, are water.

== Demographics ==
Historical population
Census	Pop.	Note	%±
1910	161		—
1920	195		21.1%
1930	188		−3.6%
1940	238		26.6%
1950	178		−25.2%
1960	246		38.2%
1970	534		117.1%
1980	732		37.1%
1990	651		−11.1%
2000	1,107		70.0%
2010	1,144		3.3%
2020	1,121		−2.0%
U.S. Decennial Census

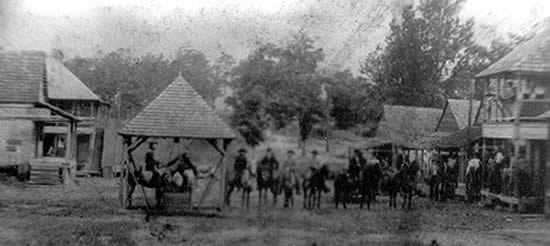
Mantachie, c. 1880s

=== 2020 census ===
Mantachie racial composition
Race	Num.	Perc.
White (non-Hispanic)	1,065	95.0%
Black or African American (non-Hispanic)	19	1.69%
Native American	1	0.09%
Asian	2	0.18%
Other/Mixed	20	1.78%
Hispanic or Latino	14	1.25%

As of the 2020 United States census, there were 1,121 people, 652 households, and 345 families residing in the town.

=== 2010 census ===
As of the census of 2010, there were 1,144 people, 511 households, and 319 families residing in the town. The population density was 290 inhabitants per square mile (110/km^{2}). There were 564 housing units at an average density of 120 per square mile (46/km^{2}). The racial makeup of the town was 96.6% White, 2.2% African American, 0.2% Native American, 0.2% Asian, 0.0 from other races, and 0.06% from two or more races. Hispanic or Latino of any race were 0.4% of the population.

There were 321 households, out of which 27.2% had children under the age of 18 living with them, 45.4% were married couples living together, 13.1% had a female householder with no husband present, and 37.2% were non-families. 25.9% of all households were made up of individuals which were 31.1% under 18 and 12.7% 65 years of age or older. The average household size was 2.85 and the average family size was 2.98.

In the town, the population was spread out, with 24.5% under the age of 18, 23.9% from 18 to 24, 28.5% from 25 to 44, 26.6% from 45 to 64, and 18.6% who were 65 years of age or older. The median age was 40.8 years. Male Population: 536 (46.9%) Female Population: 608 (53.1%)

The median income for a household in the town was $41,994, and the median income for a family was $50,046. about 11.6% of families and 9.2% of the population were below the poverty line

== Education ==
Mantachie is served by the Itawamba County School District. Mantachie Elementary School serves grades K-6, Mantachie Junior High serves grades 7 and 8, and Mantachie High School serves grades 9–12. The Mantachie Schools are rated as "B" schools by the Mississippi Department of Education.

The Mantachie Schools' nickname is the mustang. Its logo is similar to that of the SMU mascot. The school colors are royal blue and gold. The Mustangs field athletic teams in football, cross country, slow pitch and fast pitch softball, basketball, baseball, track, bowling, and archery.

== Notable people ==
- Randy Boyd, member of the Mississippi House of Representatives
- George Poteet, land speed racer and winner of the 1996 Ridler Award
- Jerry Wilburn, member of the Mississippi House of Representatives from 1964 to 1980
