= National Register of Historic Places listings in Jasper County, Georgia =

This is a list of properties and districts in Jasper County, Georgia that are listed on the National Register of Historic Places (NRHP).

This National Park Service list is complete through NPS recent listings posted March 21, 2025.

== Current listings ==
	Name on the Register	Image	Date listed	Location	City or town	Description
1	Hitchcock-Roberts House		February 14, 1979 (#79000733)	N. Warren St. 33°18′16″N 83°40′59″W	Monticello	Demolished.
2	Jasper County Courthouse	Jasper County Courthouse	September 18, 1980 (#80001097)	Courthouse Sq. 33°18′17″N 83°41′01″W	Monticello	
3	Jordan-Bellew House		January 20, 1978 (#78000990)	Madison Hwy. 33°18′35″N 83°40′42″W	Monticello	
4	Monticello High School	Monticello High School	December 14, 1978 (#78000989)	319 College St. 33°18′25″N 83°41′15″W	Monticello	
5	Monticello Historic District		August 8, 1997 (#97000812)	Roughly bounded by College, Eatonton, Forsyth, Hillsboro, and Washington Sts. and Funderburg, and Madison Drs. 33°18′07″N 83°40′56″W	Monticello	
6	Phillips-Turner-Kelly House		March 26, 2003 (#03000135)	3321 Calvin Rd. 33°22′55″N 83°42′25″W	Monticello	
7	Pope-Talmadge House		July 8, 2009 (#09000492)	2560 Calvin Rd. 33°22′24″N 83°42′11″W	Monticello	
