= IAHS =

IAHS may refer to:

- International Association of Hydrological Sciences
- International Academy of the History of Science
- Itawamba Agricultural High School
