= Monticello Historic District =

Monticello Historic District may refer to:

- Monticello Historic District (Monticello, Florida), listed on the NRHP in Florida
- Monticello Historic Commercial District (Monticello, Kentucky), listed on the NRHP in Kentucky
- Monticello Historic District (Monticello, Georgia), listed on the NRHP in Georgia
