= Monticello High School (Monticello, Georgia) =

- U.S. National Register of Historic Places
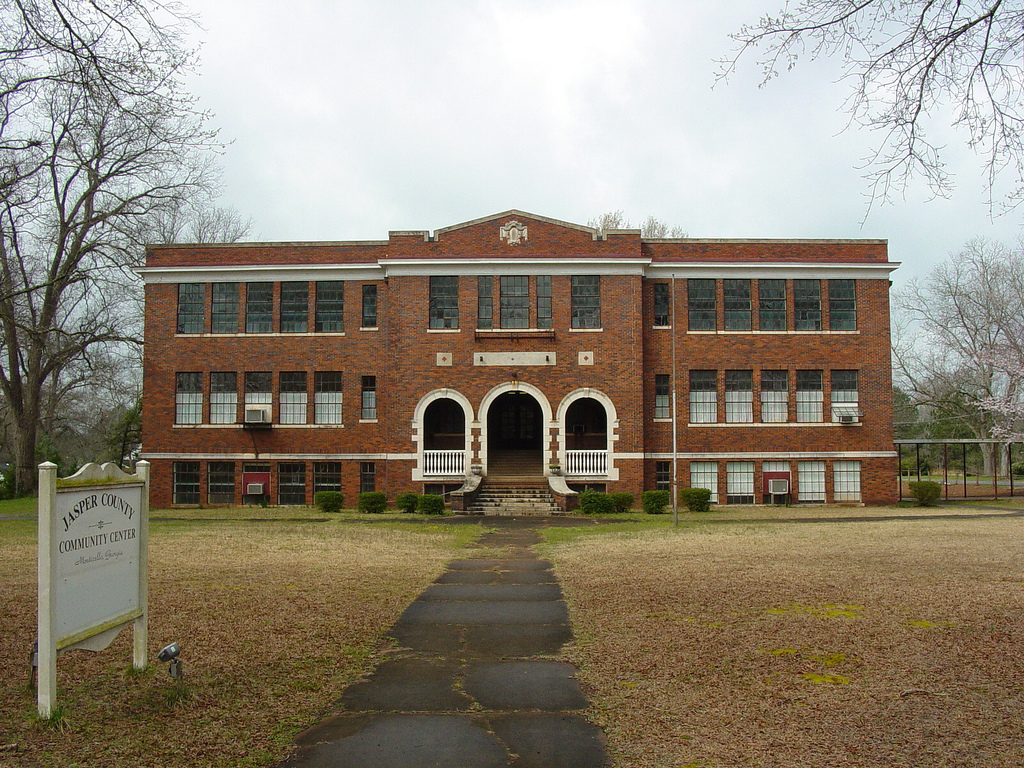

- Location within Georgia Location within the United States
- Location: College St., Monticello, Georgia
- Coordinates: 33°18′25″N 83°41′15″W
- Area: 1 acre (0.40 ha)
- Built: 1922
- Architect: Jordan, Henry Hunter
- NRHP reference No.: 78000989
- Added to NRHP: December 14, 1978

Monticello High School, now known as Thomas Persons Hall, is a historic high school in Monticello, Georgia. It was added to the National Register of Historic Places on December 14, 1978. The school is located on College Street.

It is a T-shaped three-story building that was completed in 1922. It was designed by architect Henry Hunter Jordan. It was the first county-wide school in Jasper County.

== See also ==
- National Register of Historic Places listings in Jasper County, Georgia
- Monticello Crossroads Scenic Byway
- Monticello Historic District (Monticello, Georgia)
- Jasper County High School (Georgia)
