= Fulton-Itawamba County Airport =

- IATA: none; ICAO: none; FAA LID: 11M

Summary
- Airport type: Public
- Owner: Fulton-Itawamba County Airport Board
- Location: Fulton, Mississippi
- Closed: 1999
- Elevation AMSL: 450 ft (140 m)
- Coordinates: 34°21′07″N 088°22′38″W
- Interactive map of Fulton-Itawamba County Airport

Runways
Direction	Length		Surface
Direction	ft	m	Surface
~~17/35~~	3,000	914	Asphalt
- Source: Federal Aviation Administration

Fulton-Itawamba County Airport (FAA LID: 11M) was a public use airport located five nautical miles (9 km) northeast of the central business district of Fulton, a city in Itawamba County, Mississippi, United States. It was owned by the Fulton-Itawamba County Airport Board. As per the FAA's National Plan of Integrated Airport Systems for 2009-2013, it was classified as a general aviation airport.

The airport was closed in 1999.

== Facilities and aircraft ==
Fulton-Itawamba County Airport covers an area of 76 acres (31 ha) at an elevation of 450 feet (137 m) above mean sea level. It has one runway designated 17/35 with an asphalt surface measuring 3,000 by 60 feet (914 x 18 m).
