= Piedmont National Wildlife Refuge =

Protected area in Georgia, United States

- IUCN category IV (habitat/species management area)
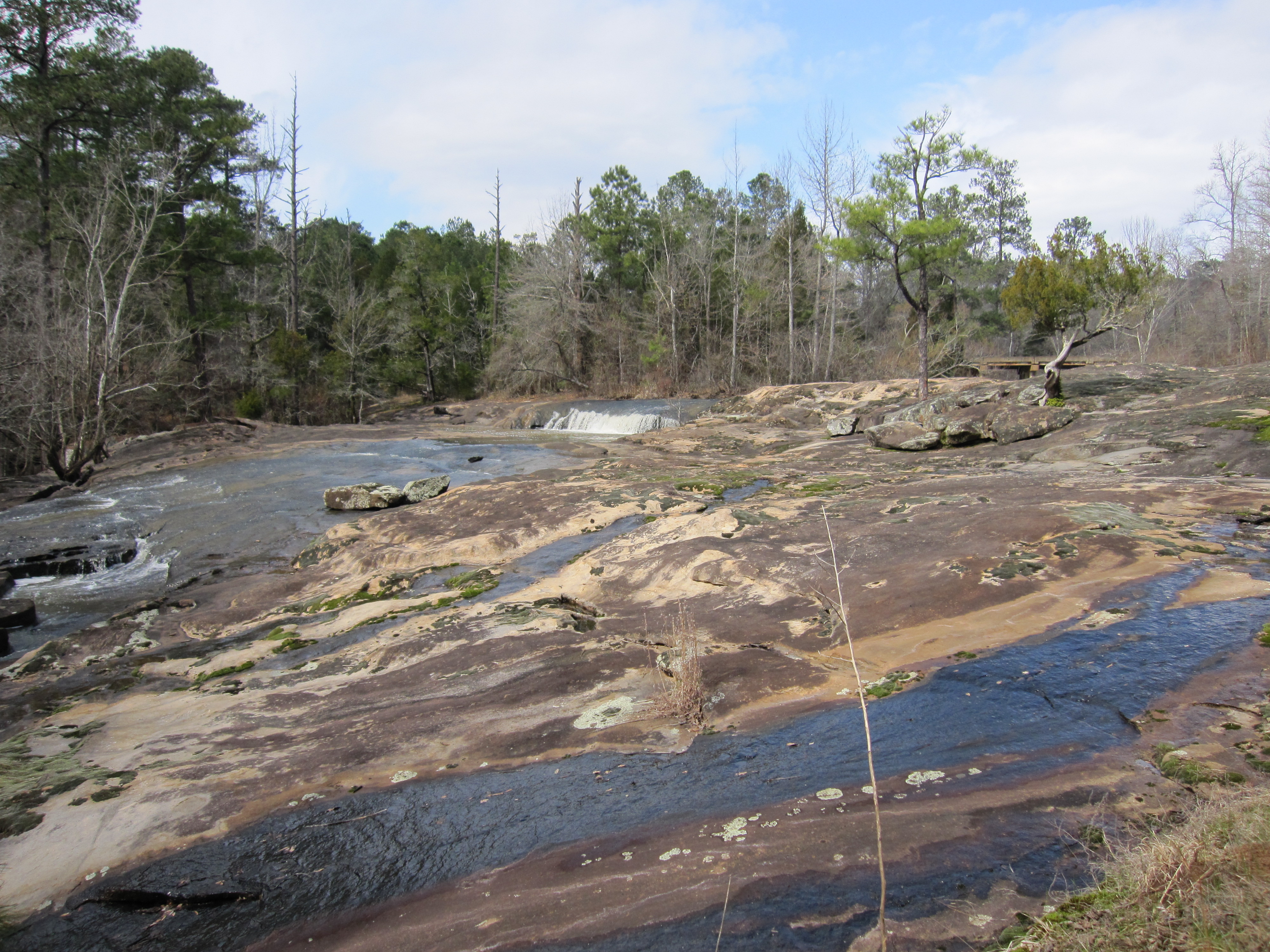
- Little Falling Creek at Piedmont National Wildlife Refuge, March 2011

- Location within the United States
- Location: Jasper County, Jones County, Georgia, United States
- Nearest city: Forsyth, Georgia
- Coordinates: 33°07′31″N 83°44′59″W
- Area: 35,000 acres (140 km^{2})
- Established: 1939
- Governing body: U.S. Fish and Wildlife Service
- Website: Piedmont National Wildlife Refuge

Piedmont National Wildlife Refuge is a 35,000-acre (140 km^{2}) National Wildlife Refuge established in 1939 and located in central Georgia.

== Geology ==
With respect to geologic setting, the Piedmont National Wildlife Refuge consists primarily of metamorphic rocks.

== Ecology ==
The Refuge is primarily an upland forest dominated by loblolly pine on the ridges with hardwoods found along the creek bottoms and in scattered upland coves. Clear streams and beaver ponds provide ideal wetland habitat for wood ducks and other wetland dependent species.

The red-cockaded woodpecker, a native bird of the southern US, is an endangered species because the older age pine forests it requires for nesting and roosting have been cleared throughout most of its range. The Refuge currently has 50 active family groups. Prescribed burning and thinning are two forest management practices used to provide habitat for the red-cockaded woodpecker. Many migratory bird species, white-tailed deer, wild turkey, and other native wildlife benefit from these management practices. The diversity of habitats provides a haven for over 200 species of birds, including many species of neotropical songbirds, and 50 species of mammals.

== Human history ==
During the early 19th century the European settlers arrived in abundance and began to clear the land to plant a variety of crops. The settlers removed more than 90% of the forest. The continuous planting of cotton caused serious erosion and soil infertility. By the late 1870s they had abandoned more than a third of the land because the land could not sustain crops.

With the combination of soil infertility, the boll weevil outbreak on remaining cotton and the Great Depression, there was wholesale abandonment of the barren eroded land in the 1930s. By then all the top soil had washed away, leaving the red clay subsoil exposed. The refuge was established from this worn out abandoned farm land where few wildlife species remained. With good soil and forest conservation practices, the wildlife habitat began to improve. Today, through the efforts of the U.S. Fish & Wildlife Service, the refuge is once again a forest.
