= Aikenton, Georgia =

Unincorporated community in Georgia, U.S.

Coordinates: 33°22′20″N 83°32′55″W

Aikenton is an unincorporated community in Jasper County, in the U.S. state of Georgia.

== History ==
A post office called Aikenton was established in 1890, and remained in operation until 1915. Aikenton had 136 inhabitants in 1900.
