= Jasper County Courthouse (Georgia) =

Historic building in Monticello, Georgia, US

- U.S. National Register of Historic Places
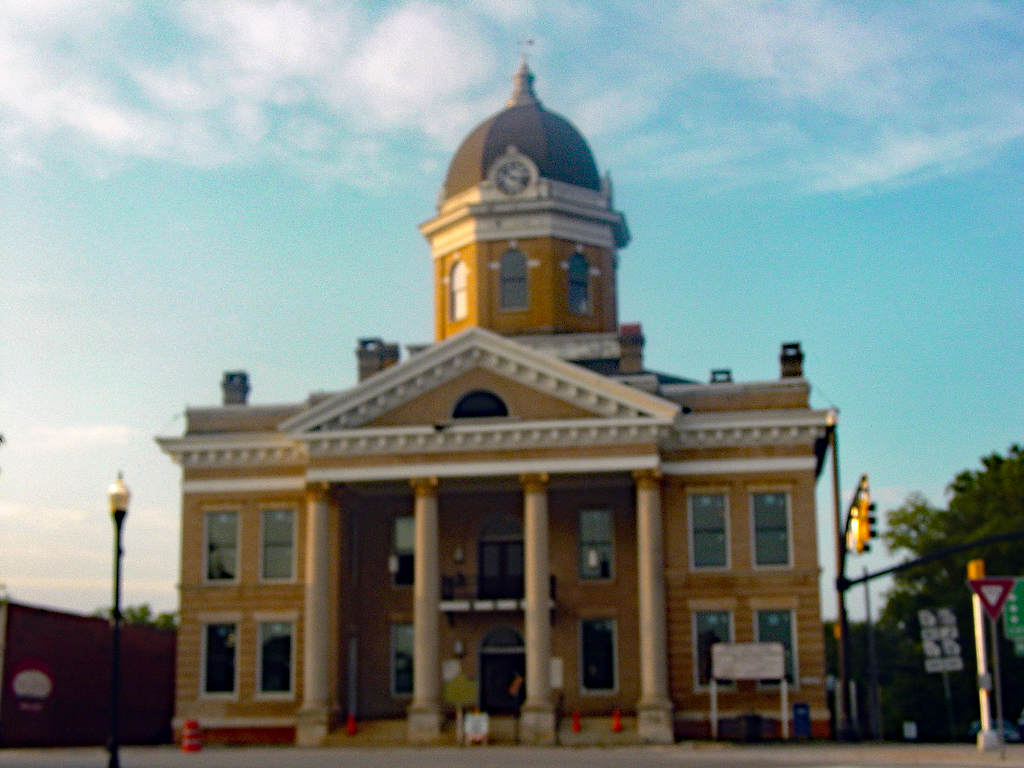

- Location within Georgia Location within the United States
- Location: Courthouse Sq., Monticello, Georgia
- Coordinates: 33°18′17″N 83°41′1″W
- Area: less than one acre
- Built: 1907
- Architect: Lockwood Bros.; W.J. Beeland
- Architectural style: Classical Revival
- MPS: Georgia County Courthouses TR
- NRHP reference No.: 80001097
- Added to NRHP: September 18, 1980

The Jasper County Courthouse in Monticello, Georgia, United States, is a building from 1907. It was listed on the National Register of Historic Places in 1980. It is notable for being used as the exterior shots for the courthouse in the 1992 film My Cousin Vinny.

The present courthouse structure is the third courthouse to stand in Jasper County.
