= Satire VI =

Satire against women by Roman author Juvenal

Satire VI is the most famous of the sixteen Satires by the Roman author Juvenal written in the late 1st or early 2nd century. In English translation, this satire is often titled something in the vein of Against Women due to the most obvious reading of its content. It enjoyed significant social currency from late antiquity to the early modern period, being read as a proof-text for a wide array of misogynistic beliefs. Its current significance rests in its role as a crucial body of evidence on Roman conceptions of gender and sexuality.

The overarching theme of the poem is a dissuasion of the addressee Postumus from marriage; the narrator uses a series of acidic vignettes on the degraded state of (predominantly female) morality to bolster his argument. At c. 695 lines of Latin hexameter, this satire is nearly twice the length of the next largest of the author's sixteen known satires; Satire VI alone composes Book II of Juvenal's five books of satire.

Satire VI also contains the famous phrase "Sed quis custodiet ipsos custodes?" (but who will guard the guards themselves?), which is variously translated as "But who will guard the guards?", "But who will watch the watchmen?", or similar. In context, it refers to the impossibility of enforcing moral behavior when the enforcers (custodes) are corruptible:

... I am aware
of whatever councils you old friends warn,
i.e. "throw the bolt and lock her in.” But who is going to guard the
guards themselves, who now keep silent the lapses of the loose
girl - paid off in the same coin? The common crime keeps its silence.
A prudent wife looks ahead and starts (her infidelities) with them.

... noui
consilia et ueteres quaecumque monetis amici,
'pone seram, cohibe'. sed quis custodiet ipsos
custodes, qui nunc lasciuae furta puellae
hac mercede silent? crimen commune tacetur.
prospicit hoc prudens et ab illis incipit uxor.
(6.O29-34)

The text of the poem is not quite certain. In particular, E.O. Winstedt in 1899 discovered in the Bodleian Library in Oxford in an eleventh-century or early 12th-century manuscript an additional 36 lines (34 placed after line 366 of the satire, and two more after line 373). The authenticity of these lines (which contain the famous quis custodiet passage above) has been debated, although in the opinion of one scholar, they are "fully worthy of Juvenal". In most modern texts the 34 lines are usually printed after line 345. There is a partial duplication between O30-O34 and 346–348.

== The themes of the poem ==
The author commences Satire VI by contrasting women of the distant past with the kind of modern Roman women seen in the poems of Catullus and Propertius:

I believe that, when Saturn was king, Chastity lingered
on the earth and was seen for a time - when a cold cave
provided little homes, and enclosed fire, household gods, cattle,
and the masters of the household in common darkness.
A mountain wife spread out her woodsy bed
with leaves, straw, and skins of local wild animals,
- hardly similar to you, Cynthia, nor to you
whose wet eye the dead sparrow stirred up -
but offering breasts that needed sucking to huge babies,
and often hairier than her acorn-burping husband.

Credo Pudicitiam Saturno rege moratam
in terris uisamque diu, cum frigida paruas
praeberet spelunca domos ignemque laremque
et pecus et dominos communi clauderet umbra,
siluestrem montana torum cum sterneret uxor
frondibus et culmo uicinarumque ferarum
pellibus, haut similis tibi, Cynthia, nec tibi, cuius
turbauit nitidos extinctus passer ocellos,
sed potanda ferens infantibus ubera magnis
et saepe horridior glandem ructante marito.
(6.1-10)

Peter Green explains: "'Cynthia' was the pseudonym which Propertius used to indicate his mistress Hostia in his poems; the girl who wept for her sparrow was 'Lesbia,' the mistress of Catullus, whose real name was Clodia." While the equation of these pseudonyms with historical women is debatable, the reference within Satire VI to Propertius and Catullus is clear. In opposition to the sophisticated, urban woman of the elegiac ideal, the woman of the mythical golden age was a simple rustic. The constant touchstone of the remainder of the poem is the deviance of contemporary Roman women from an amorphous ideal located in the unspecified past. Though it is frequently decried as a misogynistic rant, feminist scholar Jamie Corson has pointed out:

Satire VI is not merely a diatribe against women, but an all-out invective against marriage. .. This decaying of Rome’s social and moral standards has caused marriage to become the offspring of greed and corruption. Men have become weak, and allow women to challenge male supremacy so that marital power relations now favour women.

The author sets the frame for his satire with a hyperbolic presentation of the options available to the Roman male – marriage, suicide, or a boy lover:

Are you even in this day and age preparing both a prenup
and an engagement, and getting a trim from a master
barber, and you have even perchance given the pledge to her finger?
You certainly used to be sane. Postumus, are you getting married?
Tell me by what Fury and by what vipers you are goaded.
Can you endure any Master-ess when there are so many good strong ropes,
When high, vertiginous windows are wide open,
when the Aemilian bridge offers itself to you – just right next door?
Or if from so many options no mode of death strikes your fancy,
Surely you think it better that a supple boy sleep with you?
A boy, who does not conduct a nocturnal lawsuit at you, who wheedles
no little gifts from you as he lies there, and neither complains because
you are going easy on him, nor because you don’t gasp as much as he demands.

conuentum tamen et pactum et sponsalia nostra
tempestate paras iamque a tonsore magistro
pecteris et digito pignus fortasse dedisti?
certe sanus eras. uxorem, Postume, ducis?
dic qua Tisiphone, quibus exagitere colubris.
ferre potes dominam saluis tot restibus ullam,
cum pateant altae caligantesque fenestrae,
cum tibi uicinum se praebeat Aemilius pons?
aut si de multis nullus placet exitus, illud
nonne putas melius, quod tecum pusio dormit?
pusio, qui noctu non litigat, exigit a te
nulla iacens illic munuscula, nec queritur quod
et lateri parcas nec quantum iussit anheles.
(6.25-37)

Juvenal was concerned with the morality and actions of the Roman elite; Satire VI can equally be read as an invective against the men who have permitted this pervasive degradation of the Roman world. The author harshly criticizes avaricious husbands who marry not for love but for the dowry and subsequently allow their rich wives to do whatever they wish (6.136-141). Similarly, men who care only for the fleeting beauty of their wives, and then divorce them as it fades, merit condemnation (6.142-48). While women are prone to temptation, Juvenal casts men as agents and enablers of the feminine proclivity toward vice. In the written Roma of the Satires, men will even impersonate eunuchs to get unmonitored access to corrupt a woman (6.O-20-30). The literary trope of luxury imported into Roma along with the spoils of conquest and the goods (and banes) of the world is employed by Juvenal to explain the source of degradation:

Even so, do you ask from what spring these prodigies?
Humble fortune defended the chaste Latin women then,
nor did their labor, short slumbers, hard hands irritated
by Tuscan wool, Hannibal close to the city,
and husbands standing guard at the Colline tower
allow their little shelters to be stained with vices.
Now we suffer the evils of a long peace, luxury more savage than arms
presses its attack and takes vengeance for the conquered world.
No crime or act of lust is absent from where
Roman poverty has perished. To here, to these hills,
Sybaris, and Rhodes, and Miletus – flowed here -
and Tarentum too crowned and with drunken impudence.
First tainted money carried in foreign
ways, and effeminate riches shattered the ages with
foul luxury. …

unde haec monstra tamen uel quo de fonte requiris?
praestabat castas humilis fortuna Latinas
quondam, nec uitiis contingi parua sinebant
tecta labor somnique breues et uellere Tusco
uexatae duraeque manus ac proximus urbi
Hannibal et stantes Collina turre mariti.
nunc patimur longae pacis mala, saeuior armis
luxuria incubuit uictumque ulciscitur orbem.
nullum crimen abest facinusque libidinis ex quo
paupertas Romana perit. hinc fluxit ad istos
et Sybaris colles, hinc et Rhodos et Miletos
atque coronatum et petulans madidumque Tarentum.
prima peregrinos obscena pecunia mores
intulit, et turpi fregerunt saecula luxu
diuitiae molles. …
(6.286-300)

== Synopsis of the Poem by Section ==
=== Proem ===
- lines 6.1-24 – Parody of the golden age myth as dirty cave people. The ages of man: in the golden age no one feared a thief, the silver age had the first adulterers, and the remaining crimes in the Iron Age. The goddesses Pudicitia (Chastity) and Astraea (Justice) withdrew from the earth in disgust.
- lines 6.25-37 – Are you preparing to get married, Postumus, in this day and age, when you could just commit suicide or sleep with a boy?

=== Lust ===
- lines 6.38-59 – The notorious adulterer Ursidius wants a wife and children. He wants a wife of old-fashioned virtue, but he is insane to think he will get one.
- lines 6.60-81 – Marry a woman and an actor will become a father instead of you.
- lines 6.82-113 – Eppia, a senator's wife, ran off to Egypt with a gladiator.
- lines 6.114-141 – Messalina, wife of Claudius, sneaked out of the palace to work at a brothel. Lust is the least of their sins, but greedy husbands allow it for the dowry.
- lines 6.142-160 – Men love a pretty face, not the woman. When she gets old, they kick her out.

=== Pretentiousness ===
- lines 6.161-183 – The narrator would prefer a prostitute for a wife over Cornelia, since virtuous women are often arrogant. A good wife is a rara avis, like a black swan.
- lines 6.184-199 – Dressing and speaking Greek is not attractive, especially for old women.

=== Quarrelsomeness ===
- lines 6.200-230 – Women torment even men they love and want to rule the home, then they just move on to another man – one with eight husbands in five years.
- lines 6.231-245 – A man will never be happy while his mother-in-law lives; she teaches her daughter evil habits.
- lines 6.246-267 – Women cause lawsuits and love to wrangle. Some elite women practice at gladiatorial exercises, perhaps with the idea of actually entering the arena.
- lines 6.268-285 – Women cover their own transgressions with accusations of their husband's. If the husband catches them, they are even more indignant.

=== Lack of Restraint ===
- lines 6.286-313 – Poverty and constant work kept women chaste previously. It was the excessive wealth that came with conquest that destroyed Roman morality with luxury.
- lines 6.314-345 – Two women profane the shrine of Pudicitia (Chastity). Description of the now perverted rites of the Bona Dea (Good Goddess).
- lines 6.O1-O34 – the Oxford Fragment – Cinaedi (pathic males) are a moral contamination; women listen to their advice. Cups should be shattered if they drink from them. Be sure the eunuchs guarding your wife are really eunuchs. Who will guard the guards themselves?
- lines 6.346-378 – Women both high and low are the same. Women are fiscally profligate and lack foresight and self-restraint.
- lines 6.379-397 – Some women are so enthralled by musicians that they will perform sacrifices to the gods for their victory in a contest, no less than if their own husband or child were sick.

=== Unsociability ===
- lines 6.398-412 – Some women intrude into matters that pertain to men and are constantly blathering gossip and rumors.
- lines 6.413-433 – Some self-centred wealthy women are cruel to their neighbors and are horrible hostesses, keeping their guests waiting then drinking and vomiting like a snake that has fallen into a vat of wine.
- lines 6.434-456 – Women who are educated and fancy themselves orators and grammarians, disputing literary points and noting every grammatical slip of their husbands, are repulsive.
- lines 6.457-473 – Rich women are utterly out of control. They only try to look presentable for their lovers. At home for their husbands they are covered in beauty concoctions.
- lines 6.474-511 – If a woman's husband sleeps turned away, she tortures everyone at hand. Women rule their households like bloody tyrants. An army of maids is in attendance to get her ready for the public. She lives with the husband as if he were a stranger.

=== Superstitions ===
- lines 6.511-541 – The eunuch priest of Bellona and the mother of the gods is given complete credence by some women. Others are fanatic adherents of the cult of Isis and its charlatan priests.
- lines 6.542-591 – Still others listen to Jewish or Armenian soothsayers, or believe in the prophetic abilities of Chaldaean astrologers. Even worse is a woman who is so skilled at astrology that others seek her out for advice. Poor women get their fortunes told down by the Circus Maximus.

=== Drugs and Poisons ===
- lines 6.592-609 – At least poor women will have children. Rich women instead receive abortions to avoid the bother. But husbands should be glad since they would just become the father of a half-Ethiopian anyway. Women also get abandoned children to pass off as those of their husbands; these become the Roman elite – as Fortuna laughs.
- lines 6.610-626 – Women love to drug and poison their husbands to get their way. The wife of Caligula drove him insane with a potion, and Agrippina the Younger poisoned Claudius.
- lines 6.627-633 – The evil stepmother would like to poison rich stepchildren.

=== Epilogue ===
- lines 6.634-43 – The narrator asks if his listener thinks he has slipped into the hyperbole of tragedy. But Pontia admits to murdering her two children and would have killed seven if there had been seven. We should believe what the poets tell us about Medea and Procne, yet they were less evil than women now, because they did what they did due to rage, not money. There is a Clytemnestra on every street.
