= Ryan's Well, Mississippi =

- Ghost town
- Location within Mississippi Location within the United States
- Coordinates: 34°26′14″N 88°21′55″W
- Country: United States
- State: Mississippi
- County: Itawamba
- Elevation: 463 ft (141 m)
- Time zone: UTC-6 (Central (CST))
  - Summer (DST): UTC-5 (CDT)
- GNIS feature ID: 683705

Ryan's Well is a ghost town located in Itawamba County, Mississippi.

During the 1840s, a stage coach route from Aberdeen to Fulton passed through Ryan's Well. A post office operated under the name Ryans Well from 1852 to 1872.
