= Adgateville, Georgia =

Unincorporated community in Georgia, U.S.

Coordinates: 33°13′23″N 83°40′16″W

Adgateville is an unincorporated community in Jasper County, in the U.S. state of Georgia.

== History ==
Variant names were "Adgatesville" and "Grassfield". A post office called Grassfield was established in 1887, the name was changed to Adgateville in 1889, and the post office closed in 1943. The present name is after the Adgate family, proprietors of a local country store. Besides the post office, the community had a railroad depot.
