= Tilden, Mississippi =

- Unincorporated community
- Location within Mississippi Location within the United States
- Coordinates: 34°11′12″N 88°21′07″W
- Country: United States
- State: Mississippi
- County: Itawamba
- Elevation: 449 ft (137 m)
- Time zone: UTC-6 (Central (CST))
  - Summer (DST): UTC-5 (CDT)
- Area code: 662
- GNIS feature ID: 678758

Tilden is an unincorporated community located in Itawamba County, Mississippi.

== History ==
Tilden is one of the oldest communities of Itawamba County. Tilden was first settled in the 1830s by settlers from North Carolina. A post office operated under the name Tilden from 1884 to 1903.
