= Ulysses Norris =

American football player (born 1957)

No. 80, 49, 89
- Position: Tight end

Personal information
- Born: January 15, 1957 (age 69); Monticello, Georgia, U.S.
- Listed height: 6 ft 4 in (1.93 m)
- Listed weight: 230 lb (104 kg)

Career information
- High school: Monticello (GA)
- College: Georgia
- NFL draft: 1979: 4th round, 88th overall pick

Career history
- Detroit Lions (1979–1983); Buffalo Bills (1984–1985)

Career NFL statistics
- Receptions: 43
- Receiving yards: 540
- Touchdowns: 8
- Stats at Pro Football Reference

Ulysses Norris Jr. (born January 15, 1957) is an American former professional football player who played tight end for seven seasons for the Detroit Lions and Buffalo Bills.
