= Jasper County School District =

School district in Georgia (U.S. state)

Address
- 1125 Fred Smith Street Monticello, Georgia, 31064-6872; United States
- Coordinates: 33.294983°N 83.68896°W

District information
- Grades: Pre-school - 12
- Superintendent: Gene Trammell
- Accreditation(s): Southern Association of Colleges and Schools; Georgia Accrediting Commission

Students and staff
- Enrollment: 2,181
- Faculty: 532

Other information
- Telephone: (706) 468-6350
- Fax: (706) 468-0045
- Website: www.jasper.k12.ga.us

The Jasper County School District is a public school district in Jasper County, Georgia, United States, based in Monticello. It serves the communities of Monticello and Shady Dale.

== Schools ==
The Jasper County School District has two elementary schools, one middle school, and one high school.

=== Elementary schools ===
- Jasper County Primary School
- Washington Park Elementary School

=== Middle school ===
- Jasper County Middle School

=== High school ===
- Jasper County High School
