= Elizabeth Otis Dannelly =

American poet (1838–1896)

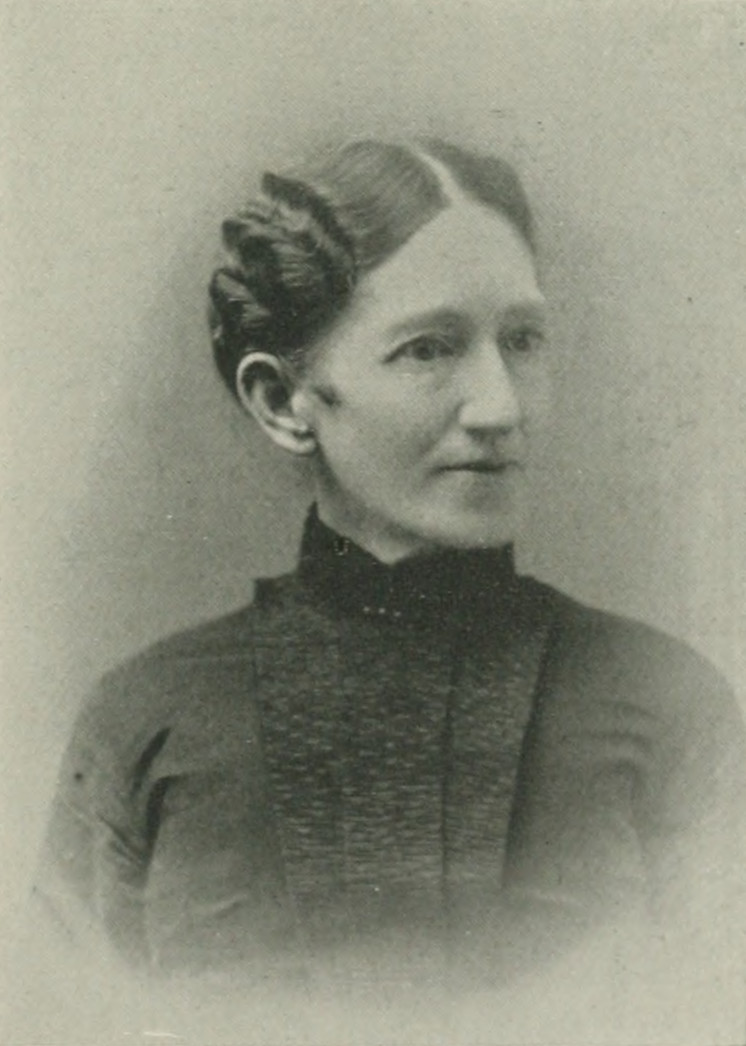
- Photo in A Woman of the Century
- Born: Elizabeth Otis Marshall; June 13, 1838; Monticello, Georgia, U.S.
- Died: March 21, 1896 (aged 57); Dallas, Texas, U.S.
- Resting place: Oakland Cemetery, Dallas, Texas, U.S.
- Education: Emory College, Madison Female College
- Occupation: poet
- Spouse: Francis Olin Dannelly (m. 1862; died 1880)
- Children: 6 sons
- Relatives: Oliver Hazard Perry, Elisha Dyer
- Writing career
- Language: English
- Genre: Southern poetry
- Notable works: Cactus, or Thorns and Blossoms; Wayside Flowers; "Destruction of the City of Columbia, South Carolina"

Elizabeth Otis Dannelly (née Marshall; June 13, 1838 – March 21, 1896) was a 19th-century American writer of Southern poetry. Though born in Georgia, she removed to Maryland after the close of the civil war where Dannelly occupied a leading social position, while being a frequent contributor to many of the periodicals and magazines of that day. She was the author, Cactus, or Thorns and Blossoms and Wayside Flowers.

== Early life and education ==
Elizabeth Otis Marshall was born in Monticello, Georgia on June 13, 1838. Her father, Jackson Marshall, was a native of Augusta, Georgia. On her mother's side, she descended from an old Huguenot family named Grinnell. Her grandfather, Peter Grinnell, was closely connected with Henry Grinnell, of Arctic expedition fame, and was also a first cousin to Oliver Hazard Perry. Her grandmother was a daughter of Anthony Dyer, uncle of Elisha Dyer, Governor of Rhode Island.

While quite young, her father moved to Oxford, Georgia, the seat of Emory College, where her early education was begun. At the age of twelve years, she was sent to school in Charleston, South Carolina, and from that city she entered the Madison Female College, Madison, Georgia, from which institution she was graduated July 26, 1855.

Immediately after receiving her diploma, Dannelly went to New York City, where one year was spent in studying painting.

== Career ==
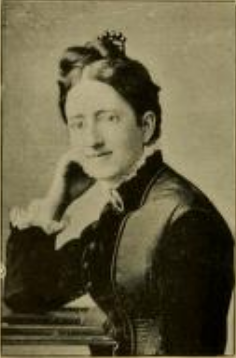
(1892)

During Dannelly's removal to New York City, her father had moved from Savannah to Madison. In Madison, on September 4, 1862, she married Dr. Francis Olin Dannelly (1823-1880), the son of Rev. James Dannelly, Methodist minister of South Carolina. Dr. Dannelly was, at the time of marriage, a surgeon in the Confederate States Army, stationed in Richmond, Virginia.

Shortly after, he was ordered to Columbia, South Carolina, where Dr. and Mrs. Dannelly continued to reside until the close of the civil war. About that time, Dannelly wrote her notable 17-page poem, "Destruction of the City of Columbia, South Carolina", which was especially prized in the South and added to the popularity of her volume of poems, Cactus, or Thorns and Blossoms (New York, 1879).

Soon after the close of the war, the Dannelly family removed to Baltimore, where her husband resumed the practice of medicine, having attained distinction in that occupation. During the years of her residence in Baltimore, Dannelly occupied a leading social position, while being a frequent contributor to many of the leading periodicals and magazines of that day.

Although a busy mother, and giving much time to religious, charitable and temperance work, she found time to add poems to her first volume, and to write a second volume, Wayside Flowers (Chicago, 1892). She also resumed painting as a recreation.

== Personal life ==
But ah, there's a picture no artist,
With magical skill, could design;
No power can fade, or efface it,
That picture forever is mine."
--Elizabeth Otis Dannelly, Waxahachie, Texas

Dannelly's life was of varying fortune, from affluence to moderation. After five years in Baltimore, the family removed to Texas, where they settled in Waxahachie. After a few years in Texas, they returned to Baltimore, where, in 1880, Dr. Dannelly died. In addition to his medical career, he wrote for the Charleston Courier using the pen name, "Frank Vivian". In 1882, the widow returned to Texas with her six boys, again locating in Waxahachie, the center of a large circle of friends. Her sons included, James, F. M., I. C., and Dyer G. Dannelly.

Elizabeth Otis Dannelly died March 21, 1896, in Dallas, Texas, and was buried at Oakland Cemetery.

== Selected works ==
=== By Elizabeth Otis Marshall Dannelly, Lady of Georgia ===
- Destruction of the city of Columbia, South Carolina : a poem, 1866

=== By Elizabeth O. Dannelly ===
- Cactus; or, Thorns and blossoms : a collection of satirical and miscellaneous, embracing religious, temperance, and memorial poems , 1879

=== By Elizabeth Otis Dannelly ===
- Wayside flowers : religious and miscellaneous poems, 1892
