= Monticello Historic District (Monticello, Georgia) =

Historic district in Georgia, United States

- U.S. National Register of Historic Places
- U.S. Historic district
- Location within Georgia Location within the United States
- Location: Roughly bounded by College, Eatonton, Forsyth, Hillsboro, and Washington Sts. and Funderburg, and Madison Drs., Monticello, Georgia
- Coordinates: 33°18′7″N 83°40′56″W
- Area: 700 acres (280 ha)
- Built: 1922
- NRHP reference No.: 97000812
- Added to NRHP: August 8, 1997

Monticello Historic District is a historic district in Monticello, Georgia. It was listed on the National Register of Historic Places on August 8, 1997. It is generally bounded by College Street, Eatonton Street, Forsyth Street, Hillsboro Street, Washington Street, Funderburg Drive, and Madison Drive. It includes Monticello's town square area. Monticello purchased and renovated the Benton Supply Department Store (1903) for its City Hall and uses its sales room as Monticello's Visitor Center. Heritage tourism is promoted through membership in Georgia's Historic Heartland Travel Association and a historic preservation ordinance was passed in 1988 and is overseen by the Monticello Historic Preservation Commission. The central commercial area and neighboring residential areas include Greek Revival, Gothic Revival, Italianate, Queen Anne, Second Empire, Colonial, Neoclassical, English Tudor, and Craftsman architecture.

== See also ==
- Monticello High School (Monticello, Georgia)
- National Register of Historic Places listings in Jasper County, Georgia
- Monticello Crossroads Scenic Byway
