= 2010 Itawamba County School District prom controversy =

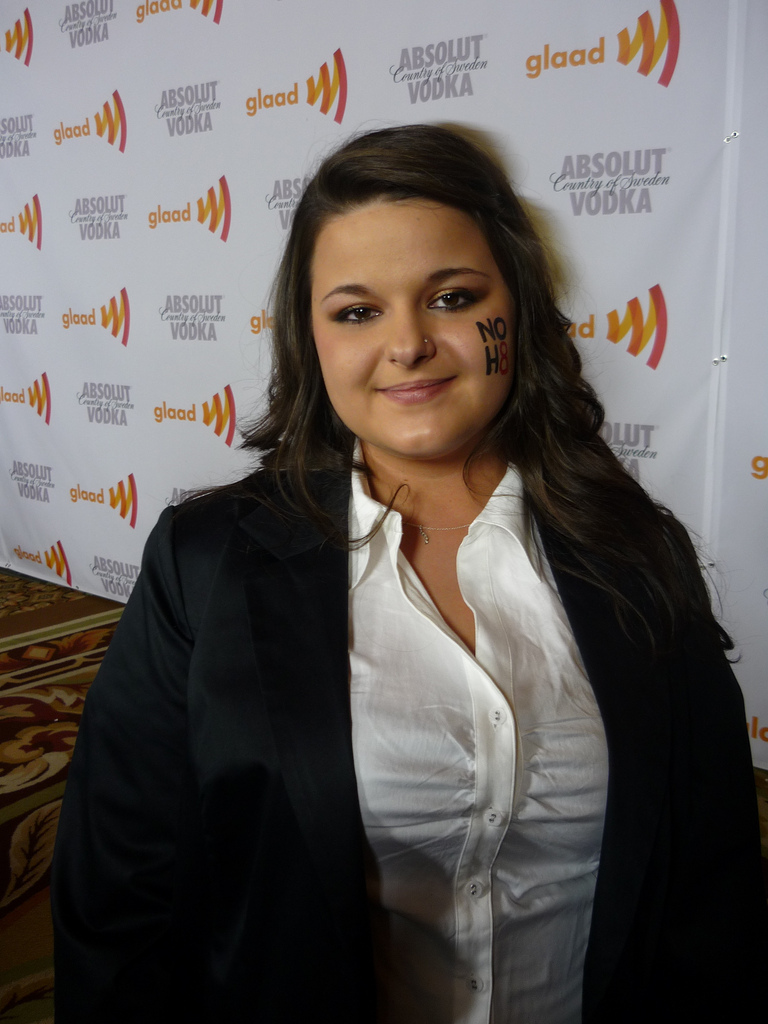
Constance McMillen at the 2010 GLAAD Media Awards

The 2010 Itawamba County School District prom controversy took place in Itawamba County, Mississippi, and began when lesbian student Constance McMillen was refused permission to take her girlfriend to the Itawamba County Agricultural High School prom. As a result of a lawsuit brought against the school, the school canceled the prom. Parents were encouraged to organize a private prom, but they canceled it. A second private prom was organized and represented to be the official prom. Meanwhile, parents organized a secret prom to which McMillen was not invited and which most of the student body attended. The school district settled the lawsuit by agreeing to a payment to McMillen and adoption of a sexual orientation non-discrimination policy.

== Incident ==
In March 2010, the Itawamba County School District board made international news after it decided to cancel the prom for Itawamba Agricultural High School because 18-year-old lesbian student Constance McMillen, from Fulton, Mississippi, had requested permission to take a same-sex date to the event, and to wear a tuxedo. The school board encouraged the creation of a private prom.

McMillen called the American Civil Liberties Union (ACLU), which threatened the school with legal action. On March 10, 2010, the ACLU filed a free speech lawsuit on McMillen's behalf, seeking an injunction which would reinstate the prom. The ACLU stated that it was "shameful and cowardly of the school district to have canceled the prom and to try to blame [the student]." On April 21, 2010, an amended complaint was filed, seeking compensatory damages.

On a March 12, 2010 appearance on The Early Show, McMillen said that she had first asked the school principal about bringing a same-sex date to the prom in December 2009, and that he said it was not allowed, due to a concern that pairs of same-sex friends who were not in a relationship would buy less expensive couples tickets instead of individual tickets. McMillen said she told him "you can't pretend like there's not gay people at our school, and if you tell people they can't bring a same-sex date, that is discrimination to them". Although the school board did not explicitly say the prom was cancelled due to McMillen's request, the cancellation came only one week after the ACLU sent a letter to the board pleading her case.

Subsequent to international press coverage of the prom's cancellation, many groups offered to sponsor a non-discriminatory prom and enough money was reportedly raised to host one. However, it was reported that adults posted signs in protest on the high school, including ones stating "What happened to the Bible Belt?" and "Gomorrah."

== Court ruling ==
On March 23, 2010, U.S. District Court Judge Glen H. Davidson issued a ruling partly in favor of McMillen and partly favorable to the Itawamba County School District. Judge Davidson ruled that Itawamba County School District did violate McMillen's First Amendment rights by not allowing her to attend the prom with her girlfriend, not allowing her to wear a tuxedo and cancelling the prom. Judge Davidson wrote, "The court finds this expression and communication of her viewpoint is the type of speech that falls squarely within the purview of the First Amendment." However, in favor of the Itawamba County School District, Judge Davidson ruled that he would not force the school district to hold the prom since a private prom had already been planned. At the preliminary hearing, school board members testified that all junior and senior students would be allowed to attend the private prom but did not make it clear as to whether or not same-sex couples would be allowed to attend. McMillen received no official information on, nor an invitation to, the private prom.

During the hearing, the school board testified that they cancelled the prom because the "media attention generated distracted the school from its educational mission, and that the board cancelled the prom in an attempt to restore order." Judge Davidson said he was not swayed by that testimony because the high school's own principal had testified to the opposite, saying that "e-mail and phone calls generated by the controversy had no impact on classroom instruction."

On July 20, 2010, the school district settled the case out of court by paying McMillen US$35,000 (equivalent to $51,675 in 2025), paying her attorneys' fees, and agreeing to create a non-discrimination policy that includes sexual orientation.

== Private prom ==
On March 30, 2010, The Clarion-Ledger newspaper reported that the original private prom scheduled to be held at the Tupelo Furniture Market had been cancelled after McMillen attempted to purchase a ticket. Lori Byrd, who served on the parent organizing committee of the private prom, told the newspaper that there were many parents involved who did not want to be sued for not allowing same-sex dates at the private prom, so they cancelled it. However, the Northeast Mississippi Daily Journal reported the following day that a new private prom had been organized, to be held at the Fulton Country Club, and that McMillen would be allowed to attend with her girlfriend.

McMillen and her date attended the prom, but found only five other students in attendance including two students "with learning difficulties." A second private prom had been arranged by parents, to be held in the community of Evergreen, and the rest of the students attended that prom instead of the Fulton Country Club prom. McMillen said she was aware of the "Evergreen" event but when she asked another student if she was invited, the student told her, "the prom is at the country club." McMillen said she took that answer as a "no" in regards to her question on whether or not she was invited and details about the secret private prom were kept from her.

Students who attended the "Evergreen" prom posted photos of the event on their Facebook pages, but many of the photos were deleted after they became public. Some students said the event was not a prom but was instead a birthday party, while others said it was just a private party. However, while claiming the event was not a prom publicly, students uploaded photos from the event to their Facebook pages labeled as "Prom 2010" and posted status updates which referred to the gathering as "prom".

McMillen subsequently transferred out of the Itawamba high school and into Murrah High School in Jackson, Mississippi, saying she was harassed by other students blaming her for the prom controversy.

== Media and celebrity attention ==
The controversy brought about worldwide media attention as well as attention from celebrities.

Dan Savage, a sex and relationship advice columnist and podcaster, exhorted his followers to contact the principal and superintendent of the school to protest the decision.

Ellen DeGeneres invited McMillen to be a guest on her television show The Ellen DeGeneres Show. On the show, DeGeneres presented McMillen with a $30,000 scholarship, paid for and donated by Tonic.com.

McMillen was also invited to be a guest by Wanda Sykes on her television show The Wanda Sykes Show. On the show, Sykes noted that she was receiving the Stephen F. Kolzack Award at the 2010 GLAAD Media Awards and that award recipients, such as her, could decide who they wanted to present their award. Sykes said that she would like McMillen to come to Los Angeles, at Sykes's expense, and be the person who presented the award to her.

Celebrity blogger Perez Hilton invited McMillen and guests of her choosing to attend at his expense a birthday bash being held for him, and she accepted. When he posted about it on his web site, he wrote that "she will be treated like a homecoming queen for the day."

Along with activists Judy Shepard and Lt. Daniel Choi, McMillen was chosen as a grand marshal of the 2010 New York City Gay Pride March.

The television series Drop Dead Diva based a season 3 episode on the incident (Prom, aired July 24, 2011) which had Jane Bingum representing two girls named Julia (portrayed by Josie Loren) and Nina Dunn (portrayed by Jenna Kanell) who have been denied the opportunity to go to prom by Mountainside High School's Principal Blake (portrayed by Michael Gross). Wanda Sykes portrays Judge Yvonne Wright who presided over the trial and McMillen has an uncredited cameo role as the bailiff.

In 2012, McMillen appeared with Lance Bass (from NSYNC) in Mississippi I Am, a documentary by Harriet Hirshorn and Katherine Linton about young gay Mississippians.

The 2016 Broadway musical The Prom, and subsequent 2020 film adaptation, were inspired by the events.

== See also ==
- Fricke v. Lynch
- Hall v Durham Catholic School Board
- LGBT rights
