= Carolina, Mississippi =

- Unincorporated community
- Location within Mississippi Location within the United States
- Coordinates: 34°07′06″N 88°28′55″W
- Country: United States
- State: Mississippi
- County: Itawamba
- Elevation: 341 ft (104 m)
- Time zone: UTC-6 (Central (CST))
  - Summer (DST): UTC-5 (CDT)
- Area code: 662
- GNIS feature ID: 668072

Carolina, also known as Bowlands or Bolands, is an unincorporated community located in Itawamba County, Mississippi.

== History ==
Carolina was first settled in 1833 and named for North Carolina and South Carolina, the original settlers' home states. The community was once home to a two-story school building.

A post office operated under the name Bolands from 1841 to 1905.

== Notable person ==
- John E. Rankin, member of the United States House of Representatives from 1921 to 1953
