= Clay, Mississippi =

- Unincorporated community
- Location within Mississippi Location within the United States
- Coordinates: 34°16′12″N 88°20′14″W
- Country: United States
- State: Mississippi
- County: Itawamba
- Elevation: 463 ft (141 m)
- Time zone: UTC-6 (Central (CST))
  - Summer (DST): UTC-5 (CDT)
- GNIS feature ID: 668531

Clay is an unincorporated community in Itawamba County, Mississippi, United States.

It is located on Mississippi Highway 178, 4.5 mi (7.2 km) east of Fulton.

Clay had a post office in the early 1900s.
