= Gladesville, West Virginia =

Unincorporated community in West Virginia, US

Coordinates: 39°28′01″N 79°52′37″W

Gladesville is an unincorporated community in Preston County, in the U.S. state of West Virginia.

== History ==
A post office called Gladesville was established in 1850, and remained in operation until 1907. The community was named for a glade near the original town site.
