= Van Buren, Mississippi =

- Ghost town
- Location within Mississippi Location within the United States
- Coordinates: 34°11′30″N 88°24′41″W
- Country: United States
- State: Mississippi
- County: Itawamba
- Elevation: 260 ft (80 m)
- Time zone: UTC-6 (Central (CST))
  - Summer (DST): UTC-5 (CDT)
- GNIS feature ID: 679181

Van Buren is a ghost town located in Itawamba County, Mississippi.

Once a busy port on the Tombigbee River, Van Buren is today a rural farm community.

== History ==
Van Buren was located on a high bluff on the river's west bank. It was named for Martin Van Buren. North of Van Buren was Frog Level Swamp.

Before Fulton was made the county seat in 1837, private homes and stores were used to conduct government business, including the store house of Elisha Thomas at Van Buren.

Winfield Walker, a nephew of Winfield Scott, settled in Van Buren in 1838, and became a merchant.

By 1840, Van Buren was the largest town in Itawamba County, and had a busy river port. The populations of both Fulton and Van Buren grew with settlers through the 1840s, and both had blacksmith shops, doctor's offices, stores, and lawyer's offices. A post office operated under the name Van Buren from 1839 to 1867.

The completion of the Mobile and Ohio Railroad west of Van Buren in the late 1850s caused river traffic to diminish; the railway "ruined it and the old site is now under cultivation".
