= Odell Thurman =

American football player (born 1983)

No. 51, 52
- Position: Linebacker

Personal information
- Born: July 9, 1983 (age 43); Monticello, Georgia, U.S.
- Listed height: 6 ft 0 in (1.83 m)
- Listed weight: 235 lb (107 kg)

Career information
- High school: Monticello
- College: Georgia Military, Georgia
- NFL draft: 2005: 2nd round, 48th overall pick

Career history
- Cincinnati Bengals (2005–2007); Florida Tuskers/Virginia Destroyers (2009–2011)

Awards and highlights
- 2× First-team All-SEC (2003, 2004)

Career NFL statistics
- Total tackles: 105
- Sacks: 1.5
- Forced fumbles: 5
- Fumble recoveries: 1
- Interceptions: 5
- Defensive touchdowns: 1
- Stats at Pro Football Reference

Odell Lamar Thurman (born July 9, 1983) is an American former professional football player who was a linebacker in the National Football League (NFL). He played college football for the Georgia Bulldogs and was selected by the Cincinnati Bengals in the second round of the 2005 NFL draft.

== Early life ==
Odell Thurman attended Jasper County High School in Monticello, Georgia. While there, he was a Macon Telegraph first-team All-Purpose All-State selection at both linebacker and fullback, and won Class AA honorable mention All-State honors from the Atlanta Journal-Constitution, and was invited to play in the 2001 Georgia-Florida all-star game. As a senior, he rushed for 1,187 yards and recorded 153 tackles. His high school football coach was Steve Patterson.

== College career ==
Odell Thurman played two years and 23 games at the University of Georgia where he was named an All-SEC player. Thurman was also a semi-finalist for the 2004 Dick Butkus Award. He entered the NFL draft after his junior season. The signature play of his career at Georgia came in a 26–7 win over Auburn in 2003. With Georgia leading 19–0, Auburn drove down to the Georgia 2 early in the fourth quarter. On third and goal, Auburn quarterback Jason Campbell threw a pass, which was deflected and intercepted by Thurman. He returned it 99 yards for a touchdown.

== Professional career ==
=== Cincinnati Bengals ===
Thurman was selected 48th overall in the second round of the 2005 NFL draft. As a rookie, Thurman logged 148 tackles. 1.5 sacks, 5 interceptions, and 4 forced fumbles. This made him an instant candidate for the NFL Defensive Rookie of the Year Award. Ultimately, San Diego Chargers linebacker Shawne Merriman won the award.

In 2006, substance problems surfaced for Thurman. He was suspended for two seasons with the Bengals for violating the league's substance abuse policy. He was released from the Bengals before the start of the 2008 season.

=== Drug and alcohol problems ===
Thurman was suspended by the National Football League for the first four games of the 2006 regular season for violating the league's substance abuse policy. According to sources, Thurman did not return to Cincinnati in time and failed to take the test.

On September 27, 2006, the NFL extended Thurman's suspension for the remainder of the season as a result of the arrest for drunk driving. Thurman's locker was emptied by the Bengals organization. Coach Marvin Lewis said he did not want to see Odell Thurman anywhere near the stadium, and he then deactivated Chris Henry for the next game for being part of the incident. Lewis later stated that he did not expect Thurman to play for the Bengals in 2007.

On February 21, 2007, Thurman pleaded no contest to the driving drunk charge and said he was undergoing treatment for alcohol abuse.

On May 15, 2007, Bengals' head coach Marvin Lewis told ESPN that Thurman would have the chance to return to the team, if reinstated by the NFL. Thurman was eligible for reinstatement on July 11, 2007. It was suspected that the organization would cut Thurman from the roster, but Lewis said otherwise.

On June 5, however, ESPN reported that he was wanted for assault in Georgia, for alleged kicking and hitting two men. Thurman and his brother were sought for questioning in connection with this assault. The sheriff involved in the case said that the incident was not quickly reported and that a magistrate would choose whether or not to continue with the charges on June 8, 2007. Conflicting reports from witnesses at the party where the assault allegedly occurred however may make prosecution of this case difficult.

On June 8, 2007, papers seeking to dismiss the charges stated above were filed, and charges against the linebacker were summarily dropped. Chrissy Pitts, deputy clerk of Magistrate Court in Jasper County, said "It was settled, we aren't aware of any terms that were involved in the settlement. That was between the attorneys and the parties."

On July 25, 2007, Thurman's request for re-instatement into the NFL was denied by commissioner Roger Goodell, so he was not able to play in 2007.

On July 12, 2008, Thurman was indicted by a grand jury for breaking another man's jaw at a water park in Sandusky, Ohio during the previous month, though, he was not arrested on the scene. On March 24, 2009, prosecutors dismissed the assault case against Thurman without prejudice citing insufficient evidence.

=== NFL reinstatement ===
On January 28, 2008, The NFL cleared linebacker Thurman to resume working out with the Cincinnati Bengals, a step toward reinstatement from his two-year suspension.

Thurman was reinstated by NFL Commissioner Roger Goodell on April 21, 2008. "Odell has met the NFL's conditions for reinstatement and has been added to our offseason roster," said Bengals coach Marvin Lewis.

On May 19, 2008, the Cincinnati Bengals waived Thurman, after Head Coach Marvin Lewis stated that the team "had not seen the right steps taken by him." However, Thurman's representatives reported that the move was related to his missing Offseason Training Activities (OTAs), which are not mandatory according to the NFL Collective Bargaining Agreement.

On June 2, 2008, Sports Illustrated reported Thurman, recently cut by the Bengals, had failed his second drug test in three seasons. Four days later, ESPN reported Thurman had been suspended by the NFL indefinitely. As part of the ruling, he could not apply for reinstatement until after the 2008 season.

=== Return to football ===
Thurman signed with the Florida Tuskers of the United Football League. In 2011, the team relocated to Virginia Beach and became the Virginia Destroyers.
