= Rara Avis, Mississippi =

- Ghost town
- Location within Mississippi Location within the United States
- Coordinates: 34°20′32″N 88°10′50″W
- Country: United States
- State: Mississippi
- County: Itawamba
- Elevation: 515 ft (157 m)
- Time zone: UTC-6 (Central (CST))
  - Summer (DST): UTC-5 (CDT)
- GNIS feature ID: 706266

Rara Avis is a ghost town located in Itawamba County, Mississippi, approximately 0.5 miles (0.8 km) west of the Alabama state line.

Rara Avis was settled in 1850.

The population was 100 in 1900. A post office was established in 1902.

Author and Baptist missionary James Garvin Chastain Sr., was born in Rara Avis in 1853.

The remains of the site have a furniture store, Rara Avis Furniture.
