= Gladesville, Georgia =

Unincorporated community in Georgia, U.S.

Coordinates: 33°11′38″N 83°46′42″W

Gladesville is an unincorporated community in Jasper County, in the U.S. state of Georgia.

== History ==
A post office called Gladesville was established in 1853, and remained in operation until 1931. The community was named for a glade near the original town site. An old variant name is "The Glades".
