= Beans Ferry, Mississippi =

- Unincorporated community
- Location within Mississippi Location within the United States
- Coordinates: 34°12′35″N 88°23′06″W
- Country: United States
- State: Mississippi
- County: Itawamba
- Elevation: 272 ft (83 m)
- Time zone: UTC-6 (Central (CST))
  - Summer (DST): UTC-5 (CDT)
- GNIS feature ID: 666629

Beans Ferry (also Boatrights Ferry) is an unincorporated community in Itawamba County, Mississippi, United States. It is located on Mississippi Highway 25, 4.5 mi (7.2 km) south of Fulton. The Mississippian Railway passes through Beans Ferry.

The hamlet is located at a site on the east bank of the Tennessee–Tombigbee Waterway (formerly the Tombigbee River), where in the 1800s, Robert Beene operated a ferry. His father, John Beene, born in 1788, helped survey the area before Itawamba County was formed, and was a member of the county's first Board of Police (elected council).

The ferry was replaced by a bridge in 1923, which was replaced by a new bridge in 1948. That bridge lasted until the construction of the Tennessee–Tombigbee Waterway in the 1970s.

A large recreation area is located at Beans Ferry, with a boat launch, viewing area, dock, parking, and picnic area.

There is an active natural gas field at Beans Ferry.
