= Itawamba Community College =

Public college in Fulton, Mississippi, US

Coordinates: 34°16′35″N 88°24′45″W

- Type: Public community college
- Established: 1948
- Academic affiliations: Space-grant
- President: Dr. Jay Allen
- Students: 5,654 (2014)
- Location: Fulton, Mississippi, United States
- Campus: Town: Remote, with campus housing in Fulton
- Colors: Navy, Cardinal
- Nickname: Indians
- Website: www.iccms.edu

Itawamba Community College is a public community college with its main campus in Fulton, Mississippi. Additional campuses are in Belden and Tupelo. Itawamba Community College serves Chickasaw, Itawamba, Lee, Monroe, and Pontotoc counties.

== History ==
Itawamba Community College began as an extension of Itawamba County Agricultural High School, one of the largest high schools in Mississippi, which was organized in 1920. In 1941, the trustees extended the curriculum to provide for two years of college work. However, World War II postponed the plans for buildings and equipment to pursue college status. In March 1948, the boards of supervisors and school boards of Itawamba, Lee and Monroe counties unanimously and harmoniously agreed to support Itawamba Junior College. A full freshman college curriculum was offered for the first time during the 1948-49 session, and sophomore work, during 1949-50. Pontotoc County began supporting the institution in 1953, and Chickasaw County in 1972.

The ICC Tupelo Campus, which was organized in July 1963, operated in vacant buildings and shops procured from businesses of the city of Tupelo. In July 1966, the school relocated into a 65,500-square-foot (6,090 m^{2}) complex, which has grown to include 11 buildings. In the fall of 1987, the name of the institution was changed to Itawamba Community College to more adequately reflect its mission and purpose.

In 2015, ICC announced their 5-year plan for the Tupelo campus. The 5-year plan involves demolishing the administration building and gym building. The school will build a new academic building which will house classes, a cafeteria, and other student services.

== Campus ==
The main campus is located in Fulton, and a branch campus in Tupelo and all technical courses are located at the Belden Center.

== Organization and administration ==
The college serves Chickasaw, Itawamba, Lee, Monroe, and Pontotoc counties. The president is Dr. Jay Allen.

== Academics ==
The college is accredited by the Commission on Colleges of the Southern Association of Colleges and Schools to award associate degrees.

== Student life ==
=== Athletics ===
The athletic teams of Itawamba Community College are known as the Indians and the school's colors are red, white and navy. ICC has eleven sanctioned collegiate sports including football, men's and women's basketball, men's and women's soccer, softball, baseball, men's and women's tennis, volleyball and golf. The men's and women's basketball teams began to play in the Davis Event Center in January 2007 and the Itawamba Community College Men's tennis program finished 15th in the Nation in the final NJCAA poll for the 2008 season. In April 2019, ICC announced the addition of women’s volleyball.

== Notable people ==
- Current District 19 member of the Mississippi House of Representatives Randy Boyd
- Former Tampa Bay Rays outfielder Desmond Jennings
- Former Milwaukee Brewers pitcher Tim Dillard
- Former Washington Redskins safety Kareem Moore
- Current Philadelphia Eagles cornerback Darius Slay
- Former New Orleans Saints and Atlanta Falcons wide receiver Joe Horn
- Former Cleveland Indians and Boston Red Sox outfielder Jonathan Van Every
- Former Miami Dolphins defensive tackle Jason Ferguson
- Former Philadelphia Eagles & Pittsburgh Steelers running back Duce Staley
- Former professional basketball player Terry Catledge
- Former Miami Dolphins defensive tackle Tim Bowens
- Former NFL defensive tackle Norman Hand
- Former Vice President of the National Football League Ron Hill
- The Honorable Michael P. Mills, United States federal judge
- Mixed Martial Artist Brandon Davis (fighter) who previously competed in the UFC.
