= Jasper County, Georgia =

County in Georgia, United States

- County
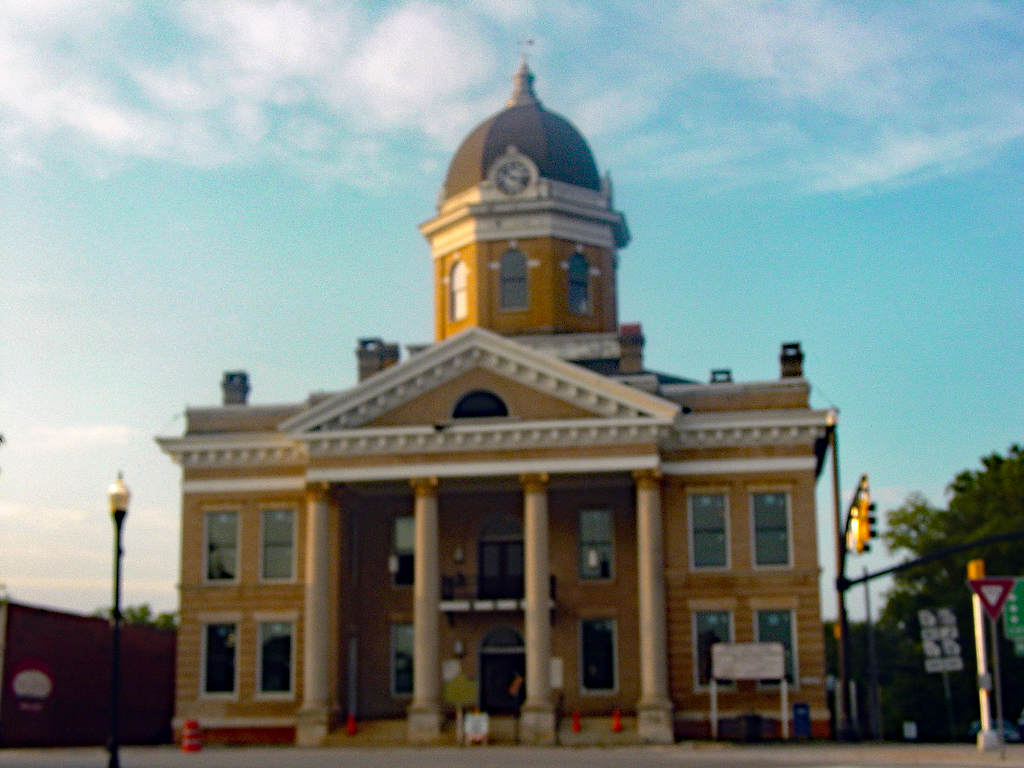
- Jasper County Courthouse

- Seal

- Location within the U.S. state of Georgia
- Coordinates: 33°19′N 83°41′W
- Country: United States
- State: Georgia
- Founded: December 10, 1807; 218 years ago
- Named for: William Jasper
- Seat: Monticello
- Largest city: Monticello

Area
  - Total: 373 sq mi (970 km^{2})
  - Land: 368 sq mi (950 km^{2})
  - Water: 5.3 sq mi (14 km^{2}) 1.4%

Population (2020)
  - Total: 14,588
  - Estimate (2025): 17,632 ▲
  - Density: 39.6/sq mi (15.3/km^{2})
- Time zone: UTC−5 (Eastern)
  - Summer (DST): UTC−4 (EDT)
- Congressional district: 10th
- Website: jaspercountyga.org

Jasper County is a county located in the central portion of the U.S. state of Georgia. As of the 2020 census, the population was 14,588, up from 13,900 in 2010. The county seat is Monticello. Jasper County is part of the Atlanta-Sandy Springs-Roswell MSA.

== History ==
This area was inhabited by indigenous peoples for thousands of years before the arrival of Europeans. At the time of European-American settlement, it was inhabited by the Cherokee and Muscogee Creek peoples, who became known as among the Five Civilized Tribes of the Southeast.

The county was created on December 10, 1807, by an act of the Georgia General Assembly with land that was originally part of Baldwin County. It became part of the new area of upland settlement through the South eventually known as the Black Belt, and a center of large plantations for short-staple cotton. Invention of the cotton gin in the late 18th century had made processing of this type of cotton profitable, and it was cultivated throughout the inland areas. As migration continued to the west, the county population rapidly rose and fell through the nineteenth century. Georgia settlers pushed Congress for the Indian Removal Act of 1830, which eventually forced most of the Native Americans west of the Mississippi River.

Jasper County was originally named Randolph County (after the Virginian John Randolph). Because of Randolph's opposition to U.S. entry into the War of 1812, the General Assembly changed the name of Randolph County to Jasper County on December 10, 1812, to honor Sergeant William Jasper, an American Revolutionary War hero from South Carolina. However, Randolph's reputation eventually was restored, and in 1828, the General Assembly created a new Randolph County.

Newton County was created from a part of the original Jasper County in 1821.

In March 1921, the bodies of at least nine Black men were found mutilated in shallow graves or local rivers. Reports indicated the men were held in peonage by a local farmer, John Williams.

The Jasper County courthouse was shown and used for filming the courthouse scenes in the 1992 comedy film My Cousin Vinny. Although the setting of the movie is in Beechum County, Alabama (a fictitious place), near the end of the movie, Sheriff Farley (played by actor Bruce McGill), actually mentions Jasper County, Georgia by name.

== Government ==
Jasper County has a five-member county commission, elected from single-member districts. The commission elects a chairman and vice-chairman to aid in conducting business. The county is protected by a combined Fire Rescue Department providing EMS and Fire Services. The department operates out of seven fire stations with the majority of their manpower being volunteers. The department employs 50 personnel, which include full-time, part-time, and volunteer employees, and is headed by a Fire Chief Christopher Finch.

== Politics ==
As of the 2020s, Jasper County is a strongly Republican voting county, voting 79% for Donald Trump in 2024. For elections to the United States House of Representatives, Jasper County is part of Georgia's 10th congressional district, currently represented by Mike Collins. For elections to the Georgia State Senate, Jasper County is part of District 25. For elections to the Georgia House of Representatives, Jasper County is part of District 144.

United States presidential election results for Jasper County, Georgia
Year	Republican		Democratic		Third party(ies)	
Year	No.	%	No.	%	No.	%
1912	8	1.20%	644	96.99%	12	1.81%
1916	6	1.08%	537	96.41%	14	2.51%
1920	42	8.92%	429	91.08%	0	0.00%
1924	68	12.95%	448	85.33%	9	1.71%
1928	140	18.13%	632	81.87%	0	0.00%
1932	14	1.77%	773	97.85%	3	0.38%
1936	33	3.45%	923	96.55%	0	0.00%
1940	72	9.44%	689	90.30%	2	0.26%
1944	86	9.97%	777	90.03%	0	0.00%
1948	87	10.06%	562	64.97%	216	24.97%
1952	228	17.10%	1,105	82.90%	0	0.00%
1956	288	23.04%	962	76.96%	0	0.00%
1960	271	22.21%	949	77.79%	0	0.00%
1964	1,075	55.90%	848	44.10%	0	0.00%
1968	456	20.57%	835	37.66%	926	41.77%
1972	1,289	73.57%	463	26.43%	0	0.00%
1976	689	27.12%	1,852	72.88%	0	0.00%
1980	879	35.39%	1,546	62.24%	59	2.38%
1984	1,431	56.05%	1,122	43.95%	0	0.00%
1988	1,474	55.08%	1,188	44.39%	14	0.52%
1992	1,153	38.14%	1,485	49.12%	385	12.74%
1996	1,423	44.00%	1,553	48.02%	258	7.98%
2000	2,298	58.28%	1,558	39.51%	87	2.21%
2004	3,157	66.56%	1,558	32.85%	28	0.59%
2008	3,916	66.25%	1,935	32.74%	60	1.02%
2012	4,136	68.45%	1,845	30.54%	61	1.01%
2016	4,360	71.86%	1,544	25.45%	163	2.69%
2020	5,822	76.13%	1,761	23.03%	64	0.84%
2024	7,203	79.00%	1,881	20.63%	34	0.37%

United States Senate election results for Jasper County, Georgia2
Year	Republican		Democratic		Third party(ies)	
Year	No.	%	No.	%	No.	%
2020	5,751	75.75%	1,690	22.26%	151	1.99%
2020	5,146	75.68%	1,654	24.32%	0	0.00%

United States Senate election results for Jasper County, Georgia3
Year	Republican		Democratic		Third party(ies)	
Year	No.	%	No.	%	No.	%
2020	3,246	43.07%	1,218	16.16%	3,073	40.77%
2020	5,120	75.26%	1,683	24.74%	0	0.00%
2022	4,951	75.76%	1,464	22.40%	120	1.84%
2022	4,569	77.34%	1,339	22.66%	0	0.00%

Georgia Gubernatorial election results for Jasper County
Year	Republican		Democratic		Third party(ies)	
Year	No.	%	No.	%	No.	%
2022	5,237	79.66%	1,286	19.56%	51	0.78%

== Geography ==
According to the U.S. Census Bureau, the county has a total area of 373 square miles (970 km^{2}), of which 368 square miles (950 km^{2}) is land and 5.3 square miles (14 km^{2}) (1.4%) is water.

The western portion of Jasper County, west of a line formed by State Route 11 to northwest of Monticello, then along the eastern border of the Piedmont National Wildlife Refuge, is located in the Upper Ocmulgee River sub-basin of the Altamaha River basin. The eastern portion of the county is located in the Upper Oconee River sub-basin of the same Altamaha River basin.

=== Major highways ===
- State Route 11
- State Route 16
- State Route 83
- State Route 142
- State Route 212
- State Route 380

=== Adjacent counties ===
- Morgan County - northeast
- Putnam County - east
- Jones County - south
- Monroe County - southwest
- Butts County - west
- Newton County - northwest

=== National protected areas ===
- Oconee National Forest (part)
- Piedmont National Wildlife Refuge (part)

== Communities ==
=== City ===
- Monticello (county seat)

=== Towns ===
- Shady Dale

=== Unincorporated communities ===
- Adgateville
- Aikenton
- Broughton
- Farrar
- Gladesville
- Hillsboro
- Morrow
- Prospect

== Demographics ==
Historical population
Census	Pop.	Note	%±
1810	7,573		—
1820	14,614		93.0%
1830	13,131		−10.1%
1840	11,111		−15.4%
1850	11,486		3.4%
1860	10,743		−6.5%
1870	10,439		−2.8%
1880	11,851		13.5%
1890	13,879		17.1%
1900	15,033		8.3%
1910	16,552		10.1%
1920	16,362		−1.1%
1930	8,594		−47.5%
1940	8,772		2.1%
1950	7,473		−14.8%
1960	6,135		−17.9%
1970	5,760		−6.1%
1980	7,553		31.1%
1990	8,453		11.9%
2000	11,426		35.2%
2010	13,900		21.7%
2020	14,588		4.9%
2025 (est.)	17,632	▲	20.9%
U.S. Decennial Census; 1790-1880 1890-1910; 1920-1930 1930-1940; 1940-1950 1960-1980; 1980-2000 2010 2020

=== Racial and ethnic composition ===
Jasper County, Georgia – Racial and ethnic composition Note: the US Census treats Hispanic/Latino as an ethnic category. This table excludes Latinos from the racial categories and assigns them to a separate category. Hispanics/Latinos may be of any race.
Race / Ethnicity (NH = Non-Hispanic)	Pop 1980	Pop 1990	Pop 2000	Pop 2010	Pop 2020	% 1980	% 1990	% 2000	% 2010	% 2020
White alone (NH)	4,450	5,434	7,964	10,095	10,771	58.92%	64.28%	69.70%	72.63%	73.83%
Black or African American alone (NH)	2,999	2,936	3,096	3,030	2,442	39.71%	34.73%	27.10%	21.80%	16.74%
Native American or Alaska Native alone (NH)	2	15	24	40	34	0.03%	0.18%	0.21%	0.29%	0.23%
Asian alone (NH)	14	10	18	30	22	0.19%	0.12%	0.16%	0.22%	0.15%
Native Hawaiian or Pacific Islander alone (NH)	x	x	1	1	1	x	x	0.01%	0.01%	0.01%
Other race alone (NH)	2	1	17	18	62	0.03%	0.01%	0.15%	0.13%	0.43%
Mixed race or Multiracial (NH)	x	x	70	176	572	x	x	0.61%	1.27%	3.92%
Hispanic or Latino (any race)	86	57	236	510	684	1.14%	0.67%	2.07%	3.67%	4.69%
Total	7,553	8,453	11,426	13,900	14,588	100.00%	100.00%	100.00%	100.00%	100.00%

=== 2020 census ===
As of the 2020 census, there were 14,588 people, 5,412 households, and 3,807 families residing in the county.

The median age was 41.7 years; 23.8% of residents were under the age of 18 and 18.1% were 65 years of age or older. For every 100 females there were 96.9 males, and for every 100 females age 18 and over there were 95.0 males age 18 and over. 0.0% of residents lived in urban areas, while 100.0% lived in rural areas.

The racial makeup of the county was 74.8% White, 16.9% Black or African American, 0.3% American Indian and Alaska Native, 0.2% Asian, 0.1% Native Hawaiian and Pacific Islander, 2.5% from some other race, and 5.3% from two or more races. Hispanic or Latino residents of any race comprised 4.7% of the population.

Of those households, 33.5% had children under the age of 18 living with them and 24.1% had a female householder with no spouse or partner present. About 23.6% of all households were made up of individuals and 11.5% had someone living alone who was 65 years of age or older.

There were 6,270 housing units, of which 13.7% were vacant. Among occupied housing units, 80.5% were owner-occupied and 19.5% were renter-occupied. The homeowner vacancy rate was 1.4% and the rental vacancy rate was 4.1%.

== Education ==
The Jasper County School District has four schools, including the Jasper County High School.

== Notable people ==
- Susan Holmes - American politician born in Jasper County. 2001 Jasper County Citizen of the Year.
- Roy "Buckshot" Jones - NASCAR driver.
- Odell Thurman - NFL player.
- Trisha Yearwood - Country music artist. In 2005, she released a studio album titled Jasper County.

== See also ==
- National Register of Historic Places listings in Jasper County, Georgia
- List of counties in Georgia
