= Itawamba County School District =

School district in Mississippi

Location
- Fulton, Mississippi; Itawamba County United States

District information
- Type: Public
- Grades: Pre-K – 12th
- Superintendent: Teresa McNeece

Other information
- Board members: School Board Member Listing
- Website: Itawamba County School District

The Itawamba County School District is a public school district based in Fulton, Mississippi, United States. The district's boundaries parallel that of Itawamba County.

== Schools ==
- Tremont Attendance Center (grades K-12), Former Principal Dawn Rogers
- Itawamba Agricultural High School (grades 9–12), Principal Rick Mitchell
- Dorsey Attendance Center (grades K-8) Principal Carson Cook
- Fairview Attendance Center (grades K-8) Principal Keitha O' Brian
- Itawamba Attendance Center (grades K-8)
- Mantachie Attendance Center (grades K-12)

== Demographics ==
=== 2006–07 school year ===
There were a total of 3,695 students enrolled in the Itawamba County School District during the 2006–2007 school year. The gender makeup of the district was 50% female and 50% male. The racial makeup of the district was 90.45% White, 8.15% African American, 1.00% Hispanic, 0.30% Asian, and 0.11% Native American. 42.1% of the district's students were eligible to receive free lunch.

=== Previous school years ===
School Year	Enrollment	Gender Makeup		Racial Makeup				
School Year	Enrollment	Female	Male	Asian	African American	Hispanic	Native American	White
2005–06	3,779	50%	50%	0.32%	8.23%	0.85%	0.08%	90.53%
2004–05	3,789	50%	50%	0.26%	7.71%	0.74%	0.05%	91.24%
2003–04	3,823	50%	50%	0.21%	7.45%	0.60%	0.03%	91.71%
2002–03	3,781	49%	51%	0.26%	7.80%	0.56%	–	91.38%

== Accountability statistics ==
	2006–07	2005–06	2004–05	2003–04	2002–03
District accreditation status	Accredited	Accredited	Accredited	Accredited	Accredited
School performance classifications
Level 5 (Superior Performing) Schools	1	0	1	1	0
Level 4 (Exemplary) Schools	4	6	4	2	4
Level 3 (Successful) Schools	1	0	1	3	2
Level 2 (Under Performing) Schools	0	0	0	0	0
Level 1 (Low Performing) Schools	0	0	0	0	0
Not Assigned	0	0	0	0	0

== Controversies ==
In 2010, Itawamba Agricultural High School found itself in the national media twice for LGBT-related issues. In one incident, a transgender student was suspended for wearing heels and makeup. In another incident, the school's prom was cancelled after a lesbian student said that she wanted to bring her girlfriend and wear a tuxedo.

In 2011, Itawamba Agricultural High School received reports that several female students had been subjected to unwanted sexual comments and touching by some of the school's coaches. A student posted an original lyric concerning the incidents. The school transferred the student to another school as discipline. The student then brought a lawsuit against the school district. The case went to the United States Court of Appeals for the Fifth Circuit which ruled against the student who then asked the Supreme Court to hear an appeal on First Amendment grounds.

== See also ==
- List of school districts in Mississippi
