= Monticello, Georgia =

- City
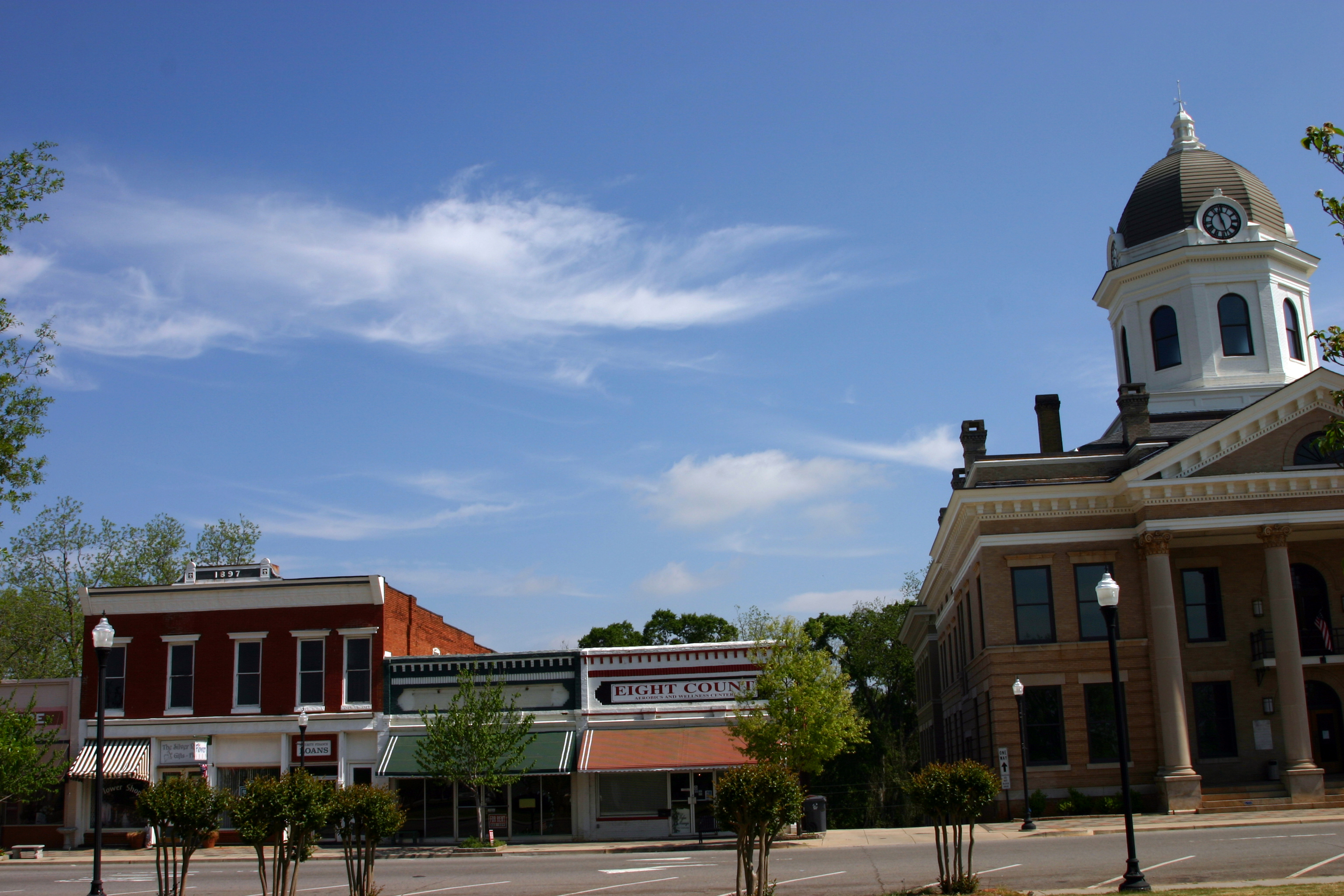
- Town square
- Motto: "Small town feel. Urban access. Endless opportunities."
- Location in Jasper County and the state of Georgia
- Coordinates: 33°18′12″N 83°41′9″W
- Country: United States
- State: Georgia
- County: Jasper
- Established: 1810

Area
  - Total: 4.28 sq mi (11.08 km^{2})
  - Land: 4.16 sq mi (10.78 km^{2})
  - Water: 0.12 sq mi (0.30 km^{2})
- Elevation: 679 ft (207 m)

Population (2020)
  - Total: 2,541
  - Density: 610.7/sq mi (235.78/km^{2})
- Time zone: UTC-5 (Eastern (EST))
  - Summer (DST): UTC-4 (EDT)
- ZIP code: 31064
- Area code: 706
- FIPS code: 13-52416
- GNIS feature ID: 0328830
- Website: www.monticellogeorgia.org

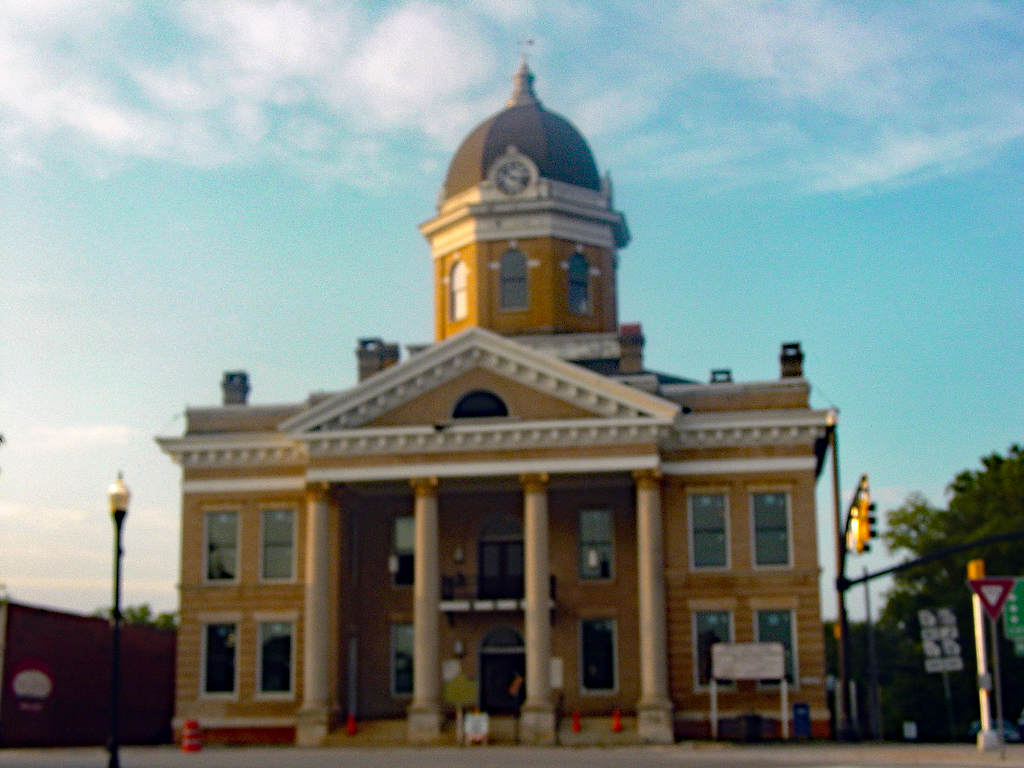
Jasper County Courthouse

Monticello is the largest city in and the county seat of Jasper County, Georgia, United States. The city includes historic buildings such as the Jasper County Courthouse, Monticello High School, and the Monticello Historic District. The population was 2,541 in 2020. It is 56 miles (90 km) southeast of Atlanta.

== History ==
Monticello was founded in 1808 as seat of the newly formed Jasper County. The city was named after Monticello, the estate of Thomas Jefferson. It was incorporated as a town in 1810 and as a city in 1901.

== Geography ==
Monticello is located in the center of Jasper County at 33°18′12″N 83°41′9″W (33.303247, -83.685766). Georgia State Routes 11, 16, 83, and 212 all meet at the center of town. SR 11 leads north 18 miles (29 km) to Mansfield and south 25 miles (40 km) to Gray, SR 16 leads east 17 miles (27 km) to Eatonton and west the same distance to Jackson, SR 83 leads northeast 9 miles (14 km) to Shady Dale and southwest 26 miles (42 km) to Forsyth, and SR 212 leads northwest 42 miles (68 km) to the outskirts of Atlanta and southeast 32 miles (51 km) to Milledgeville.

According to the United States Census Bureau, the city has a total area of 3.2 square miles (8.4 km^{2}), of which 0.03 square miles (0.07 km^{2}), or 0.89%, are water. The city is part of the Oconee River watershed.

=== Climate ===
The climate is characterized by relatively high temperatures and evenly distributed precipitation throughout the year. The Köppen Climate Classification subtype for this climate is "Cfa" (Humid subtropical climate).

Climate data for Monticello, Georgia, 1991–2020 normals, extremes 1891–present
Month	Jan	Feb	Mar	Apr	May	Jun	Jul	Aug	Sep	Oct	Nov	Dec	Year
Record high °F (°C)	81 (27)	85 (29)	91 (33)	99 (37)	102 (39)	108 (42)	109 (43)	108 (42)	107 (42)	98 (37)	92 (33)	84 (29)	109 (43)
Mean maximum °F (°C)	71.5 (21.9)	75.1 (23.9)	82.1 (27.8)	86.2 (30.1)	90.7 (32.6)	95.1 (35.1)	96.8 (36.0)	96.3 (35.7)	93.0 (33.9)	86.9 (30.5)	79.8 (26.6)	73.5 (23.1)	98.1 (36.7)
Mean daily maximum °F (°C)	57.3 (14.1)	61.4 (16.3)	69.4 (20.8)	76.7 (24.8)	83.7 (28.7)	89.2 (31.8)	92.3 (33.5)	91.0 (32.8)	86.3 (30.2)	77.7 (25.4)	68.0 (20.0)	60.1 (15.6)	76.1 (24.5)
Daily mean °F (°C)	43.3 (6.3)	46.7 (8.2)	53.6 (12.0)	61.1 (16.2)	69.1 (20.6)	76.6 (24.8)	80.1 (26.7)	78.9 (26.1)	73.1 (22.8)	63.0 (17.2)	52.6 (11.4)	45.9 (7.7)	62.0 (16.7)
Mean daily minimum °F (°C)	29.4 (−1.4)	31.9 (−0.1)	37.8 (3.2)	45.4 (7.4)	54.6 (12.6)	63.9 (17.7)	68.0 (20.0)	66.9 (19.4)	60.0 (15.6)	48.3 (9.1)	37.2 (2.9)	31.8 (−0.1)	47.9 (8.9)
Mean minimum °F (°C)	15.5 (−9.2)	20.2 (−6.6)	24.0 (−4.4)	32.6 (0.3)	42.0 (5.6)	55.4 (13.0)	62.1 (16.7)	59.0 (15.0)	48.7 (9.3)	33.6 (0.9)	24.4 (−4.2)	20.1 (−6.6)	13.9 (−10.1)
Record low °F (°C)	−7 (−22)	6 (−14)	10 (−12)	25 (−4)	36 (2)	46 (8)	54 (12)	47 (8)	40 (4)	24 (−4)	6 (−14)	2 (−17)	−7 (−22)
Average precipitation inches (mm)	4.44 (113)	4.33 (110)	4.82 (122)	3.56 (90)	2.60 (66)	3.79 (96)	4.56 (116)	3.92 (100)	3.87 (98)	2.94 (75)	3.50 (89)	4.37 (111)	46.70 (1,186)
Average snowfall inches (cm)	0.4 (1.0)	0.2 (0.51)	0.0 (0.0)	0.0 (0.0)	0.0 (0.0)	0.0 (0.0)	0.0 (0.0)	0.0 (0.0)	0.0 (0.0)	0.0 (0.0)	0.0 (0.0)	0.0 (0.0)	0.6 (1.51)
Average precipitation days (≥ 0.01 in)	7.8	7.2	7.0	6.1	5.9	8.2	8.2	7.6	6.0	5.0	5.8	6.8	81.6
Average snowy days (≥ 0.1 in)	0.2	0.1	0.0	0.0	0.0	0.0	0.0	0.0	0.0	0.0	0.0	0.0	0.3
Source 1: NOAA
Source 2: National Weather Service

=== Geology and soils ===
The bedrock under Monticello is an intermediate-to-mafic type on which dark red clay with dark reddish brown loam topsoil is mapped as Lloyd series.

== Demographics ==
Historical population
Census	Pop.	Note	%±
1880	511		—
1890	849		66.1%
1900	1,106		30.3%
1910	1,508		36.3%
1920	1,823		20.9%
1930	1,593		−12.6%
1940	1,746		9.6%
1950	1,918		9.9%
1960	1,931		0.7%
1970	2,132		10.4%
1980	2,382		11.7%
1990	2,289		−3.9%
2000	2,428		6.1%
2010	2,657		9.4%
2020	2,541		−4.4%
U.S. Decennial Census; 1850-1870 1870-1880; 1890-1910 1920-1930; 1940 1950 1960; 1970 1980 1990; 2000 2010

=== 2020 census ===
As of the 2020 census, Monticello had a population of 2,541. The median age was 38.5 years. 26.7% of residents were under the age of 18 and 18.5% of residents were 65 years of age or older. For every 100 females there were 78.4 males, and for every 100 females age 18 and over there were 76.9 males age 18 and over.

0.0% of residents lived in urban areas, while 100.0% lived in rural areas.

There were 970 households in Monticello, of which 36.3% had children under the age of 18 living in them. Of all households, 32.0% were married-couple households, 18.7% were households with a male householder and no spouse or partner present, and 43.4% were households with a female householder and no spouse or partner present. About 31.6% of all households were made up of individuals and 15.0% had someone living alone who was 65 years of age or older.

There were 1,108 housing units, of which 12.5% were vacant. The homeowner vacancy rate was 2.0% and the rental vacancy rate was 4.9%.

Monticello racial composition as of 2020
Race	Num.	Perc.
White (non-Hispanic)	1,036	40.77%
Black or African American (non-Hispanic)	1,266	49.82%
Native American	7	0.28%
Asian	1	0.04%
Other/mixed	85	3.35%
Hispanic or Latino	146	5.75%

== Education ==
=== Jasper County School District ===
The Jasper County School District holds pre-school to grade twelve, and consists of two elementary schools (K-2 & 3-5 respectively), a middle school, and a high school. The district has 132 full-time teachers and over 2,181 students.

- Jasper County Primary School
- Washington Park Elementary School
- Jasper County Middle School
- Jasper County High School
- Piedmont Academy - K3-12, co-ed, member of Georgia Independent School Association, established 1970

=== Historic school ===
- Monticello High School - presently Thomas Persons Hall

== Representation in media ==
- The Bingo Long Traveling All-Stars & Motor Kings (1976) filmed many scenes in Monticello. The exteriors of buildings on the town square were remodeled to appear of the era of the movie.
- Murder in Coweta County (1983), starring Andy Griffith, Johnny Cash, and June Carter Cash
- Many scenes of My Cousin Vinny (1992) were set at the courthouse and town square, and other scenes were also shot in town.

== Notable people ==
- William A. Connelly, sixth Sergeant Major of the Army
- Elizabeth Otis Dannelly (1838–1896), poet
- Rob Evan, singer, actor in many Broadway musicals, including The Dream Engine
- Willis Flournoy, Negro league baseball player
- Luke Gallows, professional wrestler
- Susan Holmes, politician; first female mayor of Monticello
- Buckshot Jones, NASCAR driver
- Ulysses Norris, University of Georgia football player; seven-year NFL career with the Detroit Lions (five years) and Buffalo Bills (two years)
- John Gill Shorter, 17th governor of Alabama
- Sherry Smith, Major League Baseball player, pitched in two World Series
- Odell Thurman, University of Georgia and NFL football player
- Trisha Yearwood, country singer
