= Prospect, Georgia =

Unincorporated community in Georgia, U.S.

Coordinates: 33°24′32″N 83°45′40″W

Prospect is an unincorporated community in Jasper County, in the U.S. state of Georgia.

== History ==
A variant name was "Eudora". Eudora was a name derived from the Greek meaning "generous gifts". A post office called Eudora was established in 1874, and remained in operation until 1902.
