= Itawamba County, Mississippi =

County in Mississippi, United States

- County
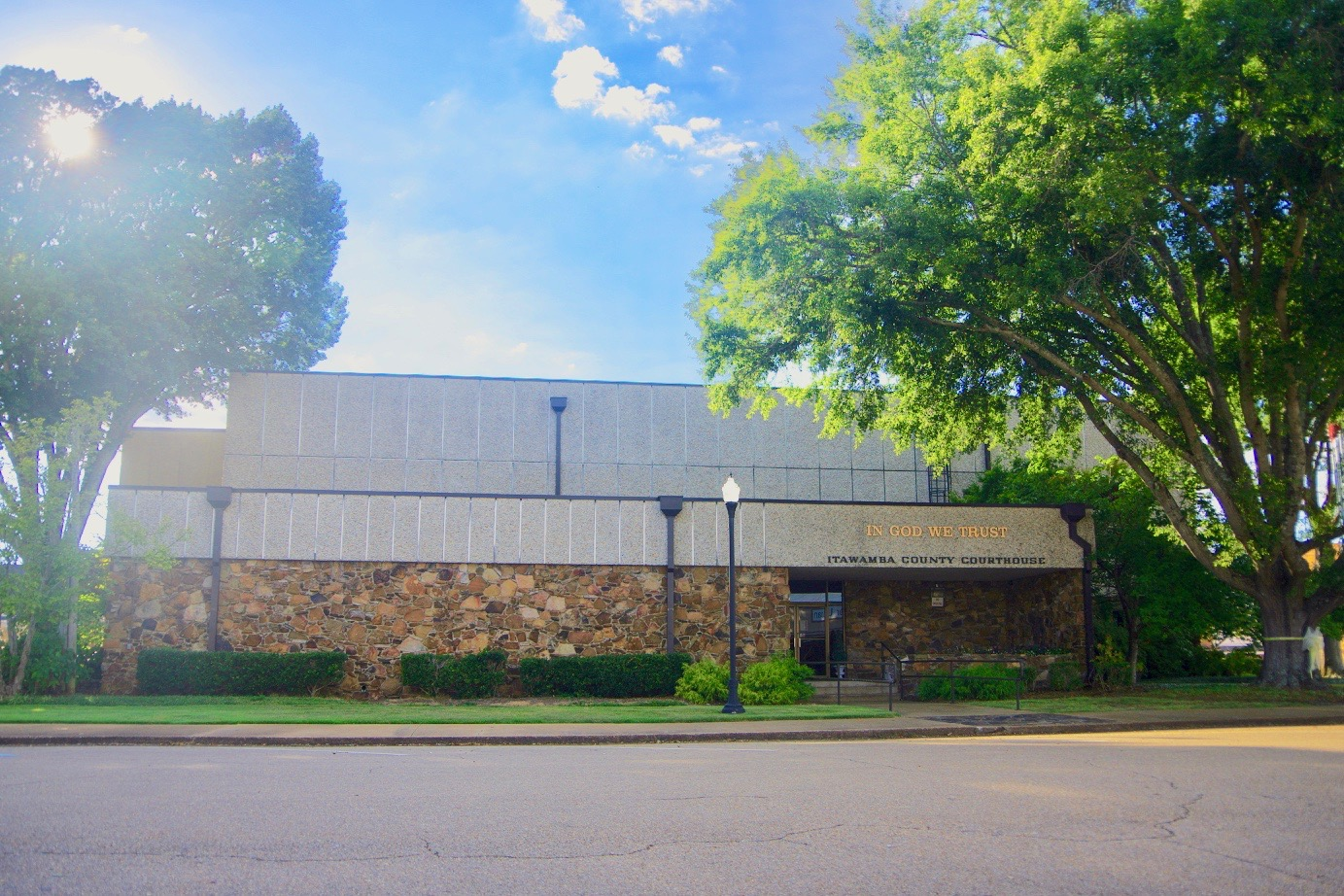
- Itawamba County Courthouse in Fulton

- Location within the U.S. state of Mississippi
- Coordinates: 34°17′N 88°22′W
- Country: United States
- State: Mississippi
- Founded: 1836
- Named for: Levi Colbert (Itawamba)
- Seat: Fulton
- Largest city: Fulton

Area
  - Total: 540 sq mi (1,400 km^{2})
  - Land: 533 sq mi (1,380 km^{2})
  - Water: 7.7 sq mi (20 km^{2}) 1.4%

Population (2020)
  - Total: 23,863
  - Estimate (2025): 24,152 ▲
  - Density: 44.8/sq mi (17.3/km^{2})
- Time zone: UTC−6 (Central)
  - Summer (DST): UTC−5 (CDT)
- Congressional district: 1st
- Website: itawamba.gov

Itawamba County is a county located in the U.S. state of Mississippi. As of the 2020 United States census, the population was 23,863. Its county seat is Fulton. The county is part of the Tupelo, MS Micropolitan Statistical Area.

The county was named for Itawamba, an early 19th-century Chickasaw leader. He was prominent during the Indian Removal period of the early 19th century, but died before his people left the area.

== Geography ==
According to the United States Census Bureau, the county has a total area of 540 square miles (1,400 km^{2}), of which 533 square miles (1,380 km^{2}) is land and 7.7 square miles (20 km^{2}) (1.4%) is water.

=== Major highways ===
- Interstate 22
- U.S. Highway 78
- Mississippi Highway 23
- Mississippi Highway 25
- Mississippi Highway 76
- Mississippi Highway 178
- Natchez Trace Parkway

=== Adjacent counties ===
- Tishomingo County - northeast
- Franklin County, Alabama - east
- Marion County, Alabama - southeast
- Monroe County - south
- Lee County - west
- Prentiss County - northwest

=== National protected area ===
- Natchez Trace Parkway (part)
- Pharr Mounds (near Tupelo), 85-acre (340,000 m^{2}) complex of earthwork burial mounds from the Middle Woodland period

== Demographics ==
Historical population
Census	Pop.	Note	%±
1840	5,375		—
1850	13,528		151.7%
1860	17,695		30.8%
1870	7,812		−55.9%
1880	10,663		36.5%
1890	11,708		9.8%
1900	13,544		15.7%
1910	14,526		7.3%
1920	15,647		7.7%
1930	18,225		16.5%
1940	19,922		9.3%
1950	17,216		−13.6%
1960	15,080		−12.4%
1970	16,847		11.7%
1980	20,518		21.8%
1990	20,017		−2.4%
2000	22,770		13.8%
2010	23,401		2.8%
2020	23,863		2.0%
2025 (est.)	24,152	▲	1.2%
US Decennial Census; 1790-1960 1900-1990; 1990-2000 2010-2013 2017

=== Racial and ethnic composition ===
Itawamba County, Mississippi – Racial and ethnic composition Note: the US Census treats Hispanic/Latino as an ethnic category. This table excludes Latinos from the racial categories and assigns them to a separate category. Hispanics/Latinos may be of any race.
Race / Ethnicity (NH = Non-Hispanic)	Pop 1980	Pop 1990	Pop 2000	Pop 2010	Pop 2020	% 1980	% 1990	% 2000	% 2010	% 2020
White alone (NH)	19,109	18,514	20,942	21,490	21,129	93.13%	92.49%	91.97%	91.83%	88.54%
Black or African American alone (NH)	1,241	1,357	1,449	1,386	1,623	6.05%	6.78%	6.36%	5.92%	6.80%
Native American or Alaska Native alone (NH)	7	18	29	44	51	0.03%	0.09%	0.13%	0.19%	0.21%
Asian alone (NH)	29	29	41	52	50	0.14%	0.14%	0.18%	0.22%	0.21%
Native Hawaiian or Pacific Islander alone (NH)	x	x	0	3	0	x	x	0.00%	0.01%	0.00%
Other race alone (NH)	14	0	1	11	37	0.07%	0.00%	0.00%	0.05%	0.16%
Mixed race or Multiracial (NH)	x	x	82	115	589	x	x	0.36%	0.49%	2.47%
Hispanic or Latino (any race)	118	99	226	300	384	0.58%	0.49%	0.99%	1.28%	1.61%
Total	20,518	20,017	22,770	23,401	23,863	100.00%	100.00%	100.00%	100.00%	100.00%

=== 2020 census ===
As of the 2020 United States census, the county had a population of 23,863. The median age was 40.1 years. 22.4% of residents were under the age of 18 and 18.4% of residents were 65 years of age or older. For every 100 females there were 94.8 males, and for every 100 females age 18 and over there were 92.1 males age 18 and over.

The racial makeup of the county was 88.9% White, 6.8% Black or African American, 0.3% American Indian and Alaska Native, 0.2% Asian, <0.1% Native Hawaiian and Pacific Islander, 0.8% from some other race, and 3.0% from two or more races. Hispanic or Latino residents of any race comprised 1.6% of the population.

<0.1% of residents lived in urban areas, while 100.0% lived in rural areas.

There were 9,057 households in the county, of which 31.2% had children under the age of 18 living in them. Of all households, 51.0% were married-couple households, 18.4% were households with a male householder and no spouse or partner present, and 25.7% were households with a female householder and no spouse or partner present. About 26.9% of all households were made up of individuals and 12.9% had someone living alone who was 65 years of age or older.

There were 10,456 housing units, of which 13.4% were vacant. Among occupied housing units, 76.5% were owner-occupied and 23.5% were renter-occupied. The homeowner vacancy rate was 1.4% and the rental vacancy rate was 22.3%.

=== 2000 census ===
As of the 2000 United States census, there were 22,770 people, 8,773 households, and 6,500 families in the county. The population density was 43 inhabitants per square mile (17/km^{2}). There were 9,804 housing units at an average density of 18 per square mile (6.9/km^{2}). The racial makeup of the county was 92.47% White, 6.47% Black or African American, 0.14% Native American, 0.18% Asian, 0.32% from other races, and 0.42% from two or more races. 0.99% of the population were Hispanic or Latino of any race.

In 2000, there were 8,773 households, out of which 33.20% had children under the age of 18 living with them, 60.30% were married couples living together, 9.90% had a female householder with no husband present, and 25.90% were non-families. 23.40% of all households were made up of individuals, and 11.10% had someone living alone who was 65 years of age or older. The average household size was 2.51 and the average family size was 2.95.

The county population contained 24.20% under the age of 18, 10.60% from 18 to 24, 27.80% from 25 to 44, 23.20% from 45 to 64, and 14.20% who were 65 years of age or older. The median age was 36 years. For every 100 females, there were 94.10 males. For every 100 females age 18 and over, there were 92.50 males.

The median income for a household in the county was $31,156, and the median income for a family was $36,793. Males had a median income of $29,231 versus $20,900 for females. The per capita income for the county was $14,956. About 10.10% of families and 14.00% of the population were below the poverty line, including 15.70% of those under age 18 and 23.60% of those age 65 or over.

== Communities ==
Itawamba County, Mississippi

=== City ===
- Fulton (county seat)

=== Towns ===
- Mantachie
- Tremont

=== Census-designated place ===
- Kirkville

=== Unincorporated communities ===
- Beans Ferry
- Bounds Crossroads
- Cadamy
- Carolina
- Clay
- Dorsey
- Tilden
- Turon

=== Ghost towns ===
- Rara Avis
- Ryan's Well
- Van Buren
- Wheeling
- Yale

== Politics ==
Originally a Democratic stronghold, Itawamba County has, since 1984, swung heavily to the Republican party. In the 21st century, it has shifted further to the right in each subsequent election, and in 2024, it was the most Republican county in Mississippi. It was also the most Republican county in the 2026 United States Senate election in Mississippi.

United States presidential election results for Itawamba County, Mississippi
Year	Republican		Democratic		Third party(ies)	
Year	No.	%	No.	%	No.	%
1912	24	2.35%	914	89.35%	85	8.31%
1916	184	11.56%	1,407	88.38%	1	0.06%
1920	198	16.18%	1,023	83.58%	3	0.25%
1924	62	6.53%	888	93.47%	0	0.00%
1928	331	27.93%	854	72.07%	0	0.00%
1932	40	2.11%	1,851	97.68%	4	0.21%
1936	47	3.11%	1,465	96.89%	0	0.00%
1940	119	6.77%	1,627	92.55%	12	0.68%
1944	183	11.94%	1,350	88.06%	0	0.00%
1948	50	2.88%	634	36.54%	1,051	60.58%
1952	556	19.91%	2,236	80.09%	0	0.00%
1956	298	11.18%	2,310	86.68%	57	2.14%
1960	366	13.21%	1,752	63.23%	653	23.57%
1964	2,140	65.50%	1,127	34.50%	0	0.00%
1968	569	9.19%	417	6.74%	5,204	84.07%
1972	4,419	89.20%	509	10.27%	26	0.52%
1976	2,153	32.11%	4,480	66.82%	72	1.07%
1980	2,906	37.00%	4,852	61.79%	95	1.21%
1984	4,587	62.96%	2,674	36.71%	24	0.33%
1988	4,535	58.95%	3,143	40.86%	15	0.19%
1992	4,142	47.54%	3,635	41.72%	936	10.74%
1996	3,490	48.22%	2,987	41.27%	760	10.50%
2000	5,424	63.33%	2,994	34.96%	146	1.70%
2004	6,833	70.37%	2,802	28.86%	75	0.77%
2008	7,663	77.01%	2,084	20.94%	204	2.05%
2012	7,393	79.34%	1,706	18.31%	219	2.35%
2016	8,470	86.99%	1,117	11.47%	150	1.54%
2020	9,438	87.24%	1,249	11.54%	132	1.22%
2024	9,523	89.66%	1,027	9.67%	71	0.67%

== Education ==
The school district is Itawamba County School District.

Itawamba Community College is in the county.

== Civil rights ==
The county holds an annual civil rights march and speaker series in January around the celebration of Martin Luther King Jr. Day.

The county was the site of the 2010 Itawamba County School District prom controversy when a lesbian student, Constance McMillen, from Fulton, had attempted to bring her partner to prom. The matter went to court, with the ACLU representing McMillen. On July 20, 2010, the school district settled the case out of court by paying McMillen US$35,000 (equivalent to $41,537 in 2020), paying her attorneys' fees, and agreeing to create a non-discrimination policy that includes sexual orientation.

== Notable people ==
- Brian Dozier, MLB All-Star second baseman, won 2019 World Series with the Washington Nationals
- Delphia Spencer Hankins, American supercentenarian
- John E. Rankin, sixteen-term Democratic U.S. Congressman from 1921 to 1953
- Jumpin' Gene Simmons, American songwriter, co-writer of Indian Outlaw
- Walter Willams, last living Confederate soldier
- Tammy Wynette, American country music artist

== See also ==
- List of counties in Mississippi
- National Register of Historic Places listings in Itawamba County, Mississippi
