= Alabama State Route 195 =

State highway in Alabama, United States

State Route 195

Route information
- Maintained by ALDOT
- Length: 42.179 mi (67.881 km)

Major junctions
- South end: SR 5 in Jasper
- US 278 / SR 33 in Double Springs
- North end: SR 13 in Haleyville

Location
- Country: United States
- State: Alabama
- Counties: Walker, Winston

Highway system
- Alabama State Highway System; Interstate; US; State
← SR 193	→ SR 196

State Route 195 (SR 195) is a 42.179-mile-long (67.881 km) highway running mainly in a north and south direction through two counties, Winston and Walker in the U.S. state of Alabama.

== Route description ==
The southern terminus of SR 195 is located at its intersection with SR 5 in Jasper. From this point the route travels in a north-northwest direction in intersecting SR 257 and traversing the William B. Bankhead National Forest en route to Double Springs. In Double Springs, SR 195 has a .195-mile (0.314 km) concurrency with US 278 prior to resuming its northerly route. The route continues in its northwesterly route through its intersection with SR 243 where it turns to the southwest en route to its northern terminus at SR 13 in Haleyville.

== Major intersections ==
County	Location	mi	km	Destinations	Notes
Walker	Jasper	0.000	0.000	SR 5 – Nauvoo, Downtown	Southern terminus
Walker	Jasper	2.499	4.022	SR 257 north (Curry Highway) – Curry	Southern terminus of SR 257
Walker	Manchester	4.219	6.790	Russell Dairy Road - Walker County Airport	
Winston	Double Springs	24.360	39.204	US 278 east (SR 74) / SR 33 north – Addison, Moulton	Southern end of US 278 concurrency; Southern terminus of SR 33
Winston	Double Springs	24.555	39.517	US 278 west (SR 74) – Natural Bridge	Northern end of US 278 concurrency
Winston	Forkville	35.489	57.114	SR 243 north – Russellville	Southern terminus of SR 243
Winston	Haleyville	42.173	67.871	SR 13 (11th Avenue) – Natural Bridge, Bear Creek	Northern terminus
1.000 mi = 1.609 km; 1.000 km = 0.621 mi: Concurrency terminus
