= Alabama State Route 243 =

State highway in Alabama, United States

State Route 243

Route information
- Maintained by ALDOT
- Length: 19.353 mi (31.146 km)

Major junctions
- South end: SR 195 in Forkville
- North end: SR 24 in Russellville

Location
- Country: United States
- State: Alabama
- Counties: Winston, Franklin

Highway system
- Alabama State Highway System; Interstate; US; State
← SR 241	→ SR 245

State Route 243 (SR 243) is a 20-mile-long (32 km) route that serves as a connection between SR 195 east of Haleyville, Alabama, United States, with SR 24 in Russellville.

== Route description ==
The southern terminus of SR 243 is located at its intersection with SR 195 west of Rabbittown. From this point, the route travels in a northeasterly direction to its northern terminus at its intersection with SR 24 in Russellville.

== Major intersections ==
County	Location	mi	km	Destinations	Notes
Winston		0.000	0.000	SR 195 – Double Springs, Haleyville	Southern terminus
Franklin	Russellville	19.353	31.146	SR 24 – Red Bay, Moulton	Northern terminus
1.000 mi = 1.609 km; 1.000 km = 0.621 mi
