= Lewis Smith Lake =

Man-made reservoir in Alabama, United States

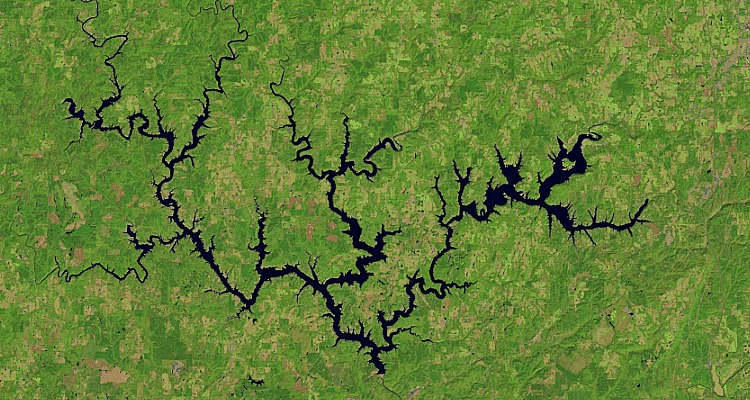
- Overhead satellite image taken in 2015 by Landsat 8 of Lewis Smith Lake located in North Alabama.

- Location within Alabama Location within the United States
- Location: Cullman / Walker / Winston counties, Alabama, United States
- Coordinates: 33°56′32″N 087°06′21″W
- Type: Reservoir
- Basin countries: United States
- Managing agency: Alabama Power
- Max. length: 35 miles (56 km)
- Surface area: 21,000 acres (85 km^{2})
- Max. depth: 264 ft (80 m)
- Water volume: 1,670,700 acre⋅ft (2.0608×10^{9} m^{3})
- Shore length^{1}: 642 miles (1,033 km)
- Surface elevation: 510 ft (160 m)
- Islands: Goat Island
- ^{1} Shore length is not a well-defined measure.

Lewis Smith Lake, also known as Smith Lake, is a reservoir in north Alabama. Located on the Sipsey Fork of the Black Warrior River, it covers over 21,000 acres (85 km^{2}) in Cullman, Walker, and Winston Counties. The maximum depth at the dam is 264 feet (80 m). It is the deepest lake in Alabama. The three-fingered reservoir has over 500 miles (800 km) of shoreline, and at full pool has a level of 510 feet (160 m).

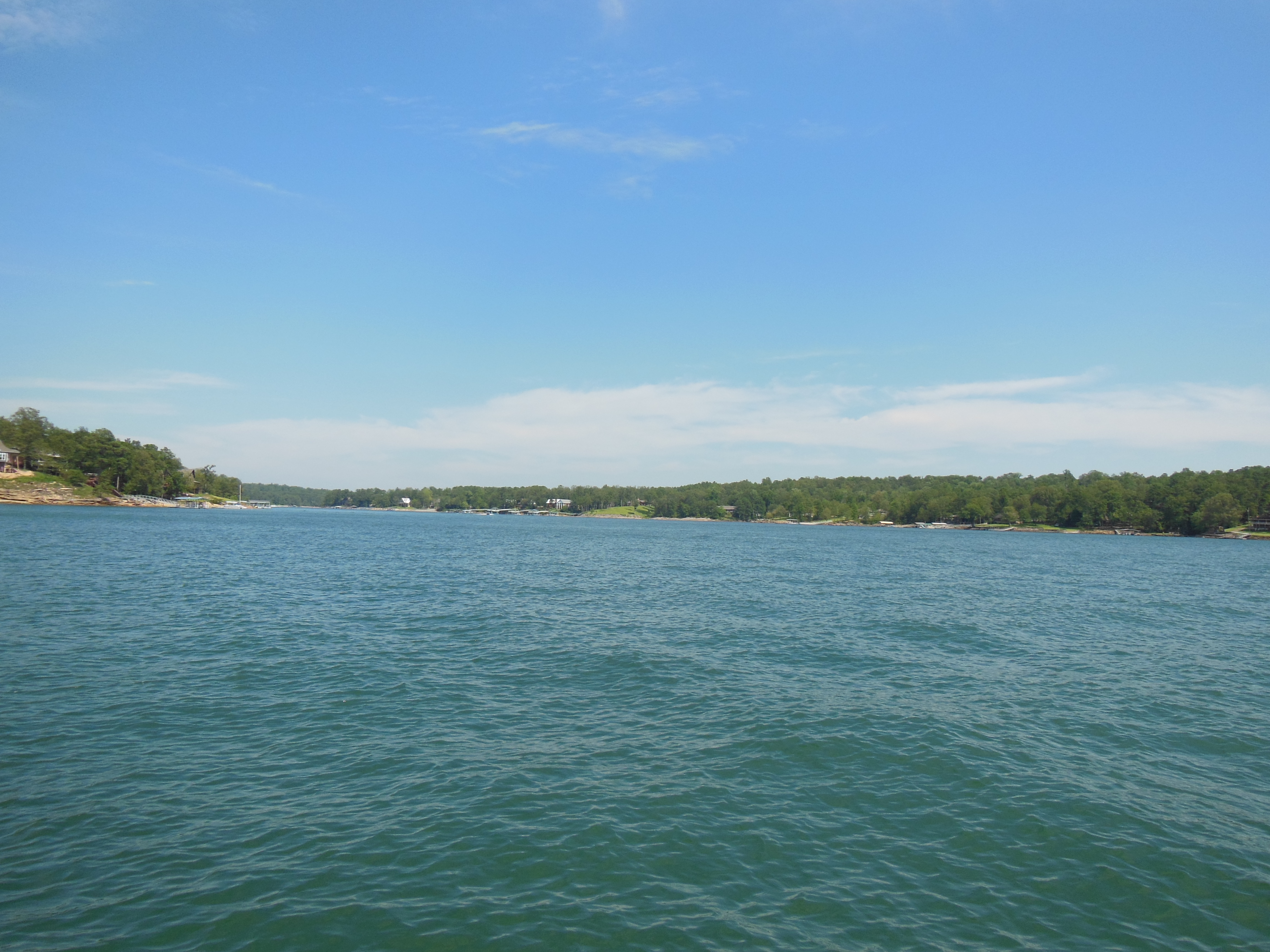
View from the water

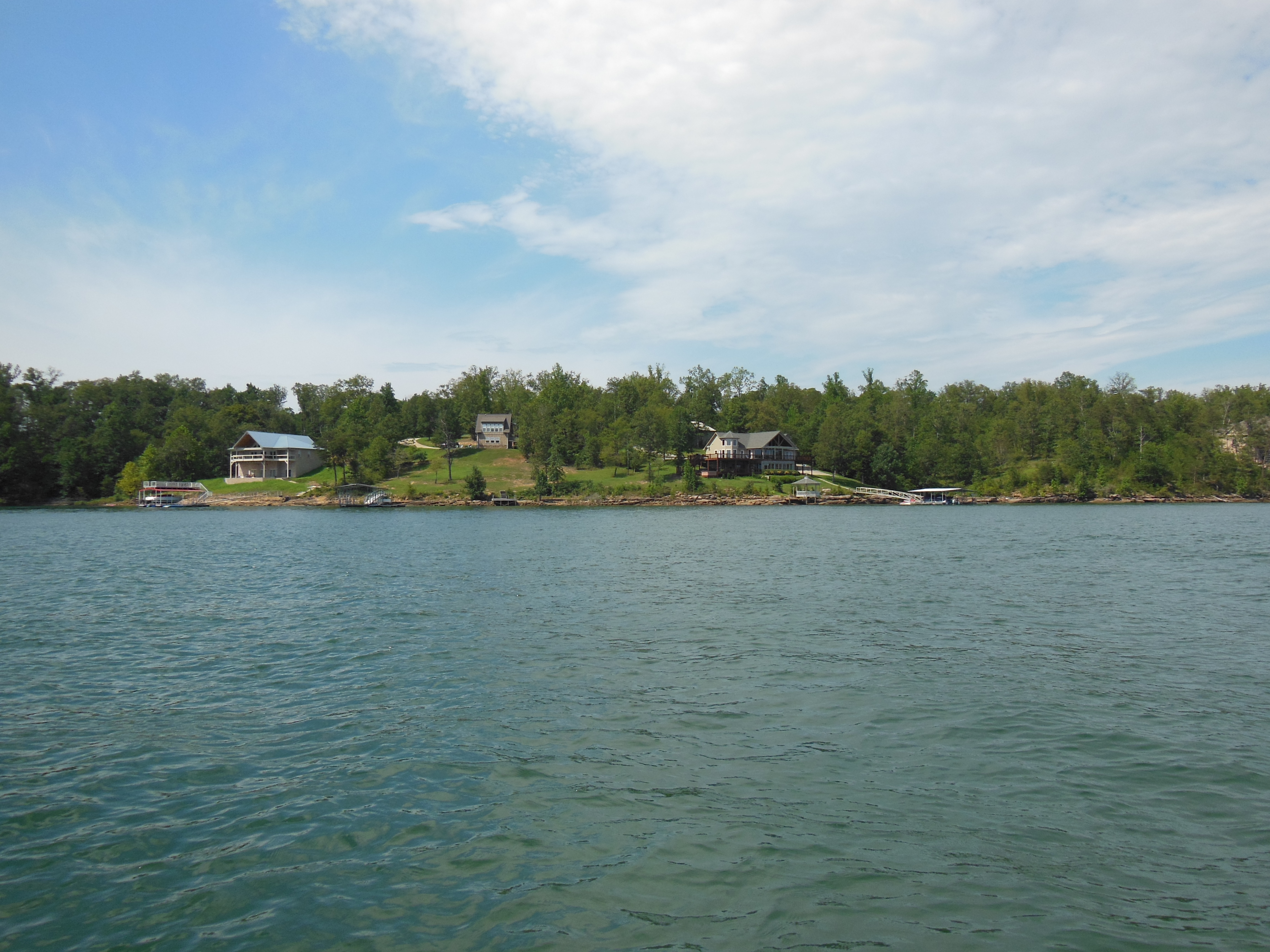
View from water of homes on the lake

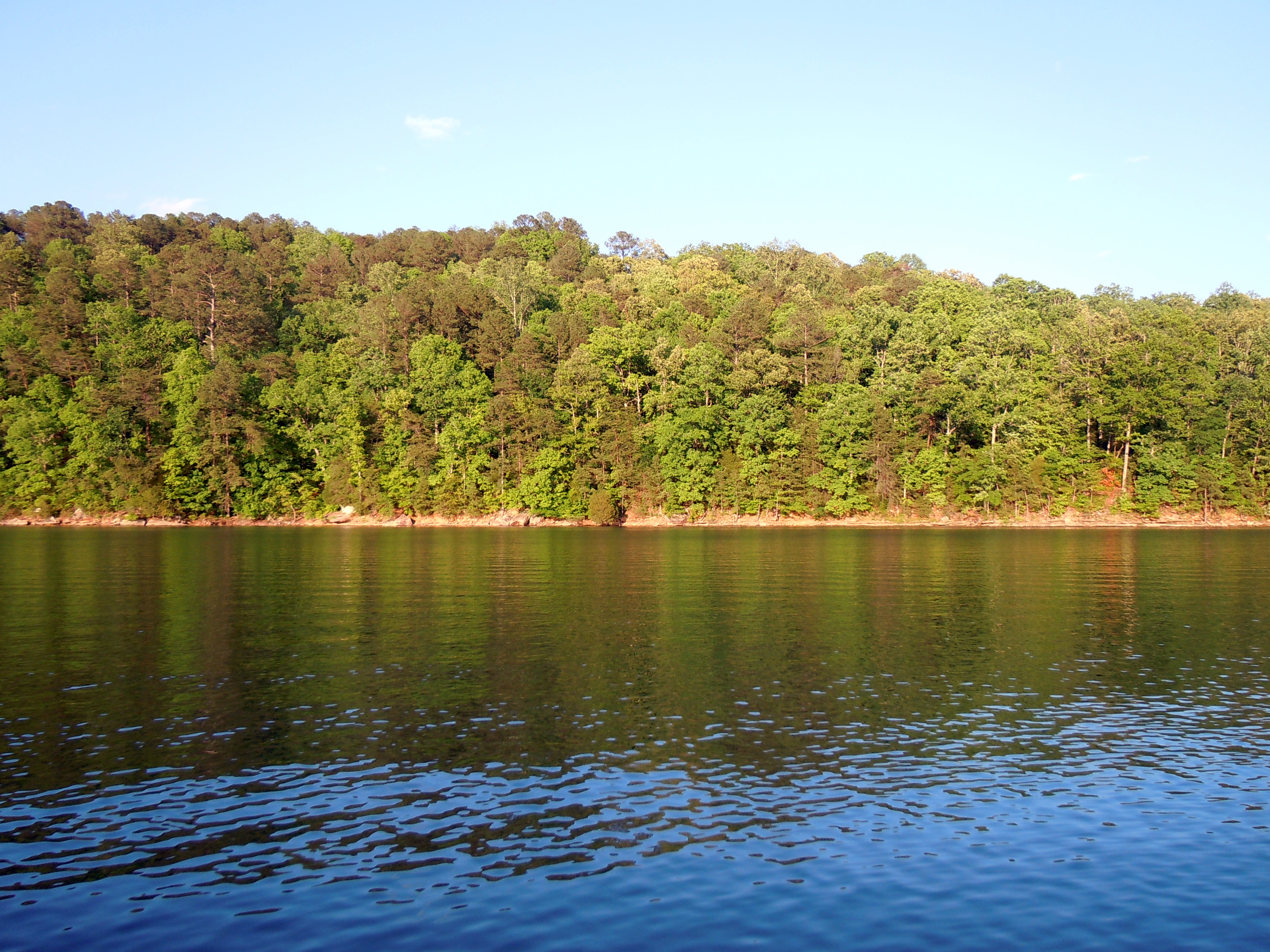

The lake was created by Alabama Power with the construction of the Lewis Smith Dam. One of the largest earthen dams in the eastern United States, it stretches 2,200 feet (670 m) in length and reaches a maximum height of 300 feet (91 m). Construction began on November 25, 1957, and the dam entered service on September 5, 1961 (64 years ago). The name honors Lewis Martin Smith, president of Alabama Power from 1952 to 1957.

Nearby towns include Bremen, Cullman, Good Hope, Crane Hill and Dodge City in Cullman County; Curry and Jasper in Walker County; and Addison, Arley, Houston, and Double Springs in Winston County. The western side of Smith Lake is partially surrounded by the William B. Bankhead National Forest, which offers camping along the lake's shoreline.

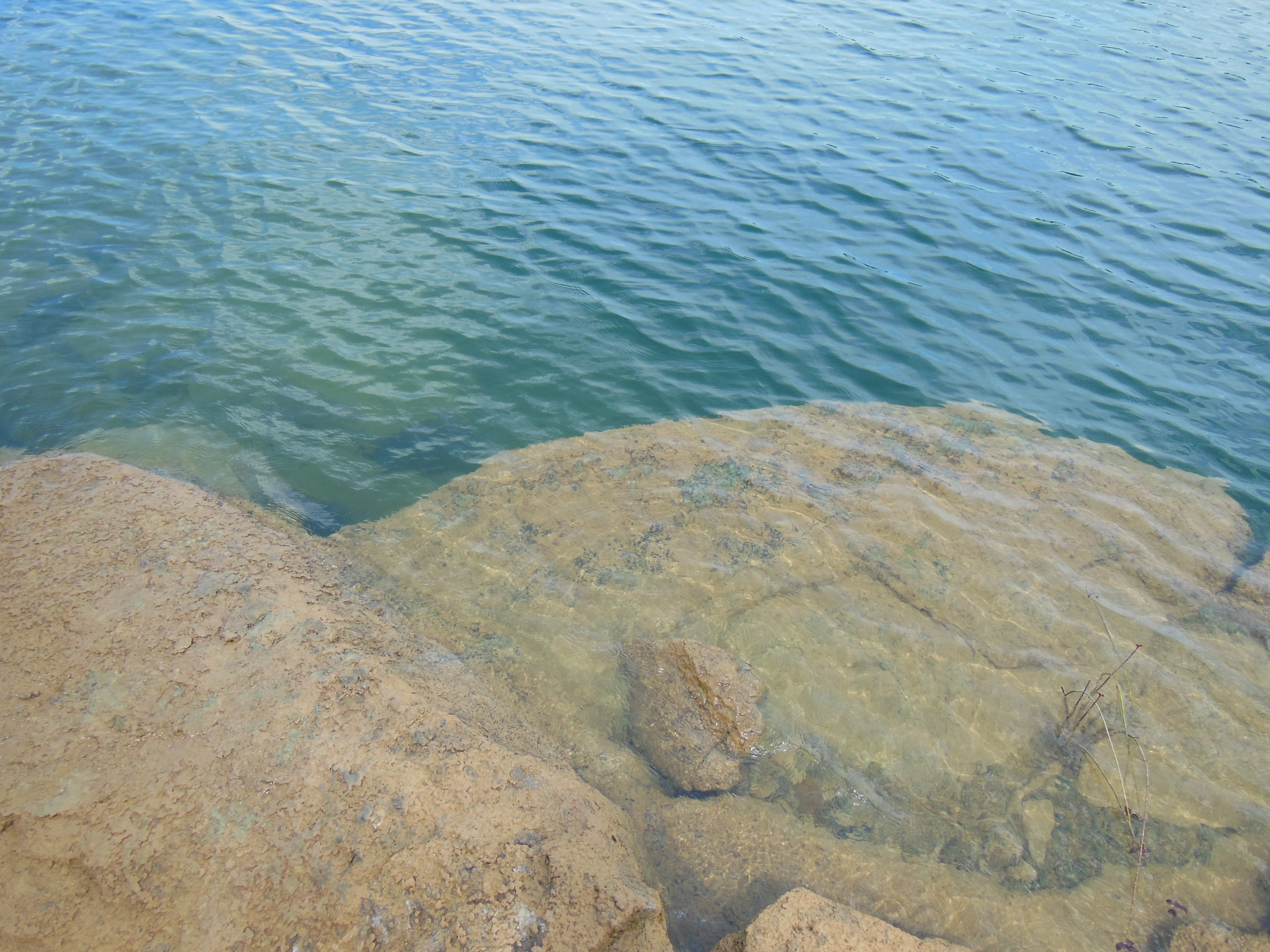
Picture of shore - Smith Lake

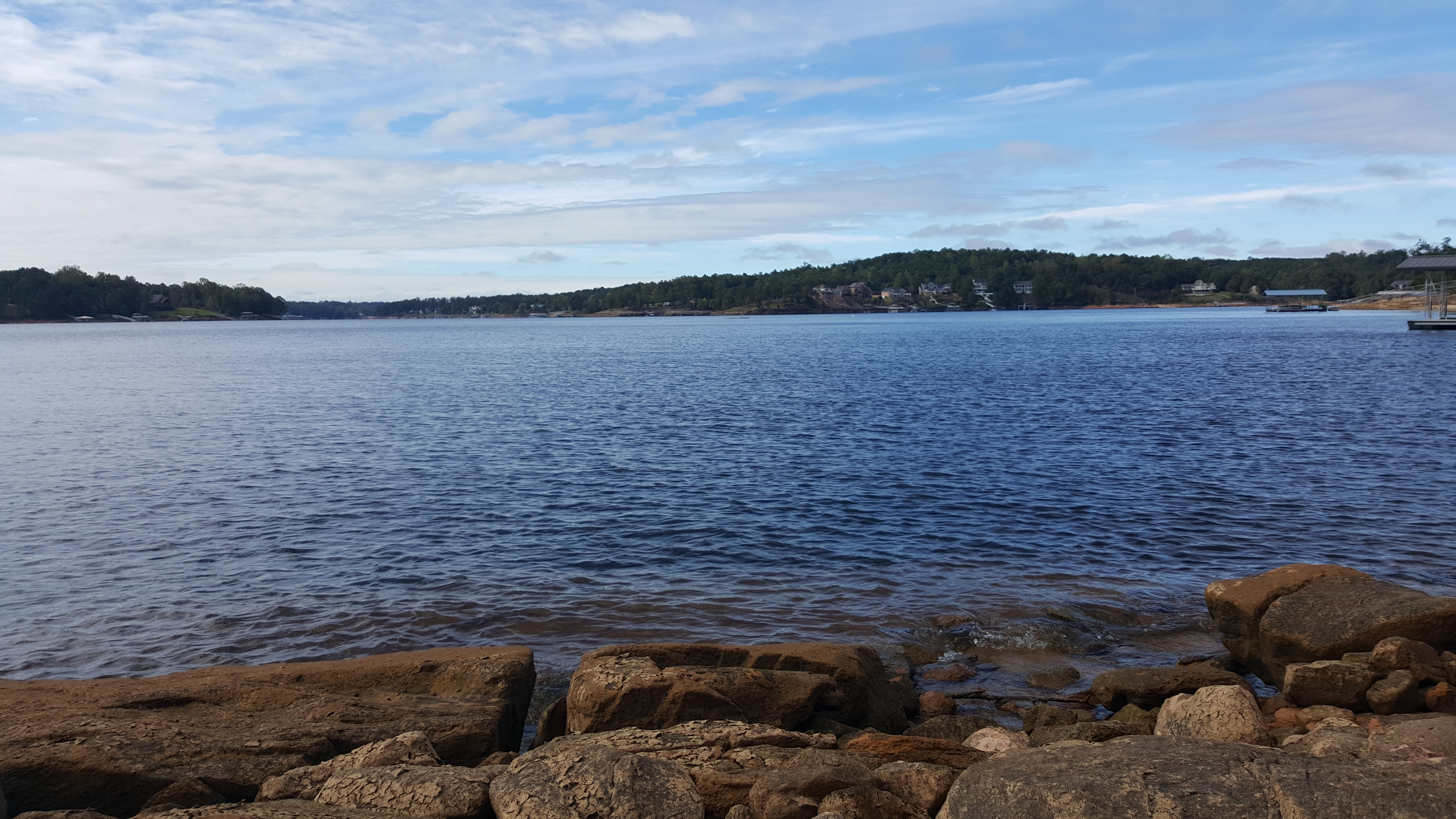

Tourist attractions are: Indian head cliff jump (30 ft), Castle Rock (40–50 ft), and the Castle.

ALABAMA POWER: LEWIS SMITH LAKE
Reservoir facts		Dam facts	
Elevation above sea level	510 ft	In service	September 5, 1961
Area	21,200 Acres	Capacity	Two generators, rating 78,750 kilowatts each
Shoreline	642 mi	Type	Rock-fill
Length	35 mi	Length	2,200 ft
Maximum depth at dam	264 ft	Maximum height	300 ft
Area of watershed draining into reservoir	944 sq mi		

== History ==
Due to the demand of coal along the Black Warrior River in the late 19th and early 20th centuries, a series of locks and dams was added north of the city of Tuscaloosa. To better regulate the water levels in these locks and dams, local business leaders pressured the federal government to build a dam on the upper fork of the Sipsey Fork tributary of the Black Warrior River. The planned lake would also provide additional power to the surrounding area during peak hours, as well as provide a source of recreational income to the otherwise sparsely populated area.

On July 27, 1954, Alabama Power filed an application with the Federal Power Commission for construction of the lake. Construction began on November 25, 1957, and the dam was formally dedicated on May 23, 1961 (65 years ago) at a cost of $29 million.

For the first 20 years, the lake remained relatively undeveloped. During the 1980s and 1990s, the lake had a rapid growth in recreation due to proximity to Birmingham and Huntsville.

Today, the lake is used primarily for recreation, but during the summer, its power plant is used during peak loads.
