= Winston County Courthouse =

- U.S. National Register of Historic Places
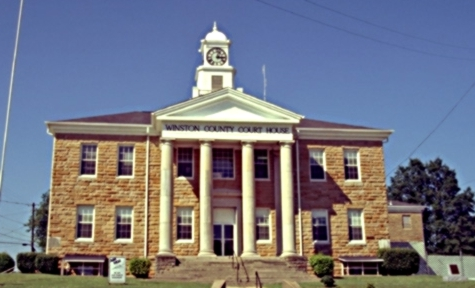
- Winston County Courthouse

- Location within Alabama Location within the United States
- Location: Addison Rd., Double Springs, Alabama
- Coordinates: 34°8′48″N 87°24′8″W
- Built: 1894
- Architect: Davis, John Eayres & Co.; Ingles, Andrew Jackson
- Architectural style: Classical Revival
- NRHP reference No.: 87001416
- Added to NRHP: August 27, 1987

The Winston County Courthouse is a historic courthouse in Double Springs, Alabama, United States. It was added to the National Register of Historic Places on August 27, 1987.

== History ==
Winston County Courthouse was created by the organization commission for Hancock County appointed April 8, 1850. Residents of Hancock county, which was later named Winston county, were asked to contribute supplies, equipment and manpower to the construction.

The commission asked every one present to return home and tell their neighbors to all meet at this site (now known as Old Houston). Their instructions were to "bring your teams, camping equipment, axes, and other tools." By noon on the appointed date, about fifty men had arrived. They cleared the courthouse construction site by the first afternoon. By the next morning the number of workers reached about 75 men from all parts of the county. Most of those present were sons, grandsons, and great-grandsons of Revolutionary Soldiers. At least half a dozen citizens had already split out the wood, and had dried puncheons to make the floor. The new court house was built, log-cabin style, 16 feet (4.9 m) by 24 feet (7.3 m) of large logs halved on both sides, making the walls about 8 inches thick. It was covered with clapboards, rib-pole, end-pole, and weight-pole style; and floored with split-log puncheons about 4 inches thick and some 12 inches (300 mm) wide, on bark peeled logs about 3 feet (0.91 m) apart; bark taken off for joists on which was the loft.

The cracks were lined on inside and out. The building set north and south, with a door 4 feet (1.2 m) wide in the south end. A stone chimney was built at the north end, about 8 feet (2.4 m) wide, to burn logs six feet long. There were windows on the side of the chimney about 2 feet (0.61 m) wide and 3 feet (0.91 m) high. Doors and windows had wood shutters made of thick boards, and swung on wood hinges. The roof was clapboards about 4 feet (1.2 m) long. Benches were made out of puncheons with large peg legs. The building nearly ready in two days. Workers went home but returned May 27 and completed it.

When Hancock County was renamed Winston in 1858, the courthouse was moved to the present site of Houston, beside where the old jail now stands. A fire destroyed the courthouse on August 23, 1864; an act passed on December 11, 1865, authorized the building of the jail and court house, which burned again on February 23, 1868. A special tax was levied on February 1, 1871, to rebuild it again.

In 1877 when the eastern portion of the county was annexed into Cullman County, Houston was no longer in the center of the county. House bill #264 was passed December 12, 1882 to move the county seat to Double Springs; the move was made on July 23, 1883. A 40 x 60 wooden building consisting of two stories was the court house building in Double Springs. On August 5, 1891, fire spread through this court house destroying it.

Work was commenced on May 29, 1893, on the new court house. William C. Miles and a Mr. Coley, from Birmingham, worked on the building for Andrew Jackson Ingle, and the rock wagons continued "as regular as clock work." Francis Hadder was the carpenter and James Samuel Snoddy was the assistant. This time the new building consisted of the native sand rock like several buildings in town. It was completed in 1894 at a cost of $12,444.

== Improvements ==
In 1911 an annex was added during the administration of John S. Curtis, Probate Judge, at a cost of $4,000. A new fire-proof wing and jail were added to the court house in 1929 by Warren, Knight, and Davis of Birmingham for about $70,000. The lowest bid for construction was awarded to the local firm of Burdick and Woodruff. In the 1950s a $35,000 addition was added to the east wing. In 1962, Dobbs and Dobbs of Haleyville got a contract to add an addition to the wing on the north side for $77,900. This gave additional room in the jail, and the lower part is now used for the commissioners' office. Kermit Adams quarried this rock at Black Pond and laid the rock on this addition. In the summer of 1982, Nolan Smith built a wood addition for $38,950.

== Sources ==
- "The Creation and Organization of Hancock County" by Judge John Bennett Weaver
- the Acts of Alabama
- information obtained from the Winston County Court House, including the county commission department
- the Double Springs Centennial Scrapbook
