= JFX =

JFX may refer to:

- JavaFX, a software platform
- Jones Falls Expressway, a freeway in Baltimore, Maryland
- Walker County Airport, in Alabama, United States
