= Winston County, Alabama =

County in Alabama, United States

- County
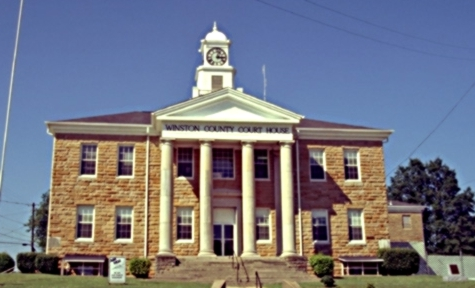
- Winston County Courthouse in Double Springs

- Location within the U.S. state of Alabama
- Coordinates: 34°08′57″N 87°22′29″W
- Country: United States
- State: Alabama
- Founded: February 12, 1850
- Named for: John A. Winston
- Seat: Double Springs
- Largest city: Haleyville

Area
  - Total: 632 sq mi (1,640 km^{2})
  - Land: 613 sq mi (1,590 km^{2})
  - Water: 19 sq mi (49 km^{2}) 3.0%

Population (2020)
  - Total: 23,540
  - Estimate (2025): 23,829 ▲
  - Density: 38.4/sq mi (14.8/km^{2})
- Time zone: UTC−6 (Central)
  - Summer (DST): UTC−5 (CDT)
- Congressional district: 4th
- Website: winstonal.gov
- County number 67 on Alabama license plates; Highest county number in Alabama; Widely known as "The Free State of Winston."

Winston County is a county of the U.S. state of Alabama. As of the 2020 census, the population was 23,540. Its county seat is Double Springs. Known as Hancock County before 1858, the county is named in honor of John A. Winston, the fifteenth Governor of Alabama. The county had few slaves and has been a bastion of Republican Party loyalty for much of its history, even during the many decades of Democratic Party domination across much of the South and in the state of Alabama after the Reconstruction era.

== History ==
Hancock County was established February 12, 1850, from territory that was part of Walker County (a county directly to the south of Winston County). Originally named for John Hancock, Governor of Massachusetts and famous signer of the American Declaration of Independence, its county seat was at Houston. On January 22, 1858, the county was renamed Winston County to honor Alabama Gov. John A. Winston.

During the American Civil War, Winston County gained attention for its opposition to secession, a sentiment so strong that the county is sometimes referred to as the Free State of Winston. This area had few slaves and saw little benefit to secession. The county today plays on its reputation as the "Free State of Winston" to attract tourists. The county's opposition to the Confederacy is briefly mentioned in the novels To Kill a Mockingbird and Addie Pray.

In 1883, the county seat was moved from Houston, Alabama to Double Springs to be near the center of the county, since Cullman County was created from the eastern part of Winston County.

=== National Register of Historic Places ===
Winston County has four sites listed on the National Register of Historic Places: Archeological Site No. 1WI50, Feldman's Department Store, the Houston Jail, and the Winston County Courthouse.

== Geography ==
According to the United States Census Bureau, the county has a total area of 631 square miles (1,630 km^{2}), of which 613 square miles (1,590 km^{2}) is land and 1.9 square miles (4.9 km^{2}) (3.0%) is water.

=== Adjacent counties ===
- Lawrence County (north)
- Cullman County (east)
- Walker County (south)
- Marion County (west)
- Franklin County (northwest)

=== National protected area ===
- William B. Bankhead National Forest (part)

== Demographics ==
Historical population
| Census | Pop. | Note | %± |
|---|---|---|---|
| 1850 | 1,542 | | — |
| 1860 | 3,576 | | 131.9% |
| 1870 | 4,155 | | 16.2% |
| 1880 | 4,253 | | 2.4% |
| 1890 | 6,552 | | 54.1% |
| 1900 | 9,554 | | 45.8% |
| 1910 | 12,855 | | 34.6% |
| 1920 | 14,378 | | 11.8% |
| 1930 | 15,596 | | 8.5% |
| 1940 | 18,746 | | 20.2% |
| 1950 | 18,250 | | −2.6% |
| 1960 | 14,858 | | −18.6% |
| 1970 | 16,654 | | 12.1% |
| 1980 | 21,953 | | 31.8% |
| 1990 | 22,053 | | 0.5% |
| 2000 | 24,843 | | 12.7% |
| 2010 | 24,484 | | −1.4% |
| 2020 | 23,540 | | −3.9% |
| 2025 (est.) | 23,829 | ▲ | 1.2% |
U.S. Decennial Census; 1790–1960 1900–1990; 1990–2000 2010–2020

=== 2020 census ===
As of the 2020 census, the county had a population of 23,540. The median age was 45.6 years. 20.3% of residents were under the age of 18 and 21.8% of residents were 65 years of age or older. For every 100 females there were 96.0 males, and for every 100 females age 18 and over there were 93.4 males age 18 and over.

The racial makeup of the county was 92.4% White, 0.6% Black or African American, 0.5% American Indian and Alaska Native, 0.3% Asian, 0.0% Native Hawaiian and Pacific Islander, 1.7% from some other race, and 4.5% from two or more races. Hispanic or Latino residents of any race comprised 3.5% of the population.

0.0% of residents lived in urban areas, while 100.0% lived in rural areas.

There were 9,845 households in the county, of which 27.5% had children under the age of 18 living with them and 26.1% had a female householder with no spouse or partner present. About 29.2% of all households were made up of individuals and 14.3% had someone living alone who was 65 years of age or older.

There were 13,015 housing units, of which 24.4% were vacant. Among occupied housing units, 76.6% were owner-occupied and 23.4% were renter-occupied. The homeowner vacancy rate was 2.1% and the rental vacancy rate was 12.6%.

=== Racial and ethnic composition ===
Winston County, Alabama – Racial and ethnic composition Note: the US Census treats Hispanic/Latino as an ethnic category. This table excludes Latinos from the racial categories and assigns them to a separate category. Hispanics/Latinos may be of any race.
| Race / Ethnicity (NH = Non-Hispanic) | Pop 2000 | Pop 2010 | Pop 2020 | % 2000 | % 2010 | % 2020 |
|---|---|---|---|---|---|---|
| White alone (NH) | 24,055 | 23,237 | 21,598 | 96.83% | 94.91% | 91.75% |
| Black or African American alone (NH) | 93 | 115 | 131 | 0.37% | 0.47% | 0.56% |
| Native American or Alaska Native alone (NH) | 107 | 139 | 83 | 0.43% | 0.57% | 0.35% |
| Asian alone (NH) | 30 | 59 | 58 | 0.12% | 0.24% | 0.25% |
| Pacific Islander alone (NH) | 2 | 8 | 9 | 0.01% | 0.03% | 0.04% |
| Other race alone (NH) | 8 | 4 | 39 | 0.03% | 0.02% | 0.17% |
| Mixed race or Multiracial (NH) | 176 | 283 | 807 | 0.71% | 1.16% | 3.43% |
| Hispanic or Latino (any race) | 372 | 639 | 815 | 1.50% | 2.61% | 3.46% |
| Total | 24,843 | 24,484 | 23,540 | 100.00% | 100.00% | 100.00% |

=== 2010 census ===
At the 2010 census there were 24,484 people, 10,163 households, and 7,074 families living in the county. The population density was 40 people per square mile (15 people/km^{2}). There were 13,469 housing units at an average density of 22 units per square mile (8.5 units/km^{2}). The racial makeup of the county was 95.6% White, 0.5% Black or African American, 0.7% Native American, 0.2% Asian, 0.1% Pacific Islander, 1.5% from other races, and 1.4% from two or more races. Nearly 2.6% of the population were Hispanic or Latino of any race. There were 10,163 households, 26.2% had children under the age of 18 living with them, 54.2% were married couples living together, 10.9% had a female householder with no husband present, and 30.4% were non-families. Nearly 27.1% of households were made up of individuals, and 12.2% were one person aged 65 or older. The average household size was 2.38, and the average family size was 2.86.

The age distribution was 21.6% under the age of 18, 7.4% from 18 to 24, 23.6% from 25 to 44, 29.6% from 45 to 64, and 17.7% 65 or older. The median age was 43.1 years. For every 100 females, there were 96.5 males. For every 100 females age 18 and over, there were 100.8 males.

The median household income was $33,685 and the median family income was $39,784. Males had a median income of $38,074 versus $23,301 for females. The per capita income for the county was $18,055. 15.4% of the population and 20.6% of families were below the poverty line. 31.4% of those under the age of 18 and 14.4% of those 65 and older were living below the poverty line.

=== 2000 census ===
At the 2000 census there were 24,843 people, 10,107 households, and 7,287 families living in the county. The population density was 40 people per square mile (15 people/km^{2}). There were 12,502 housing units at an average density of 20 units per square mile (7.7 units/km^{2}). The racial makeup of the county was 97.32% White, 0.038% Black or African American, 0.46% Native American, 0.13% Asian, 0.01% Pacific Islander, 0.90% from other races, and 0.81% from two or more races. Nearly 1.5% of the population were Hispanic or Latino of any race. There were 10,107 households, 31.80% had children under the age of 18 living with them, 59.6% were married couples living together, 9.10% had a female householder with no husband present, and 27.9% were non-families. Nearly 25.6% of households were made up of individuals, and 11.4% were one person aged 65 or older. The average household size was 2.43, and the average family size was 2.89.

The age distribution was 23.7% under the age of 18, 7.90% from 18 to 24, 28.7% from 25 to 44, 25.5% from 45 to 64, and 14.2% 65 or older. The median age was 38 years. For every 100 females, there were 96 males. For every 100 females age 18 and over, there were 93.5 males.

The median household income was $28,435 and the median family income was $32,628. Males had a median income of $26,206 versus $17,760 for females. The per capita income for the county was $15,738. 17.1% of the population and 12.9% of families were below the poverty line. 21.8% of those under the age of 18 and 23% of those 65 and older were living below the poverty line.

=== Religion ===
At the 2010 US Religion Census:

- Southern Baptist Convention (11,113)
- The United Methodist Church (1,117)
- Churches of Christ (978)
- Church of God (Cleveland) (784)
- Assemblies of God (295)
- Catholic Church (223)

== Politics ==
Unlike nearly every other county in the Deep South, and in keeping with its history during the American Civil War, Winston County has always been a bastion of support for the Republican Party, even as the Democratic Party utterly dominated Alabama state politics from the end of Reconstruction until the passage of the Civil Rights Act of 1964. The county elected Populist candidate James B. Weaver in 1892. In 1912, Winston County joined just three other Alabama counties in voting for the Bull Moose Party candidacy of Theodore Roosevelt. From 1915 to 1919 it was represented by Republican lawyer Chester Tubb in the Alabama House of Representatives. In 1932, the county backed Democrat Franklin D. Roosevelt by just a single vote, even while Roosevelt carried the state as a whole overwhelmingly. In four consecutive presidential elections from 1936 to 1948, Winston County was the only county in the state to vote for the Republican ticket, and one of just 2 in the Deep South to vote Republican in all four of those elections, that county being Fannin County in Georgia.

The only Democrat to win the county since 1936 (or to get a majority in it since 1880) has been Jimmy Carter in 1976, and in recent times Winston County has become comparably Republican to the Texas Panhandle. Winston County did vote for George Wallace in 1968, who was the Democratic candidate in the state. Winston was the only county in Alabama to give a majority of its votes to Republican candidate Thomas E. Dewey in 1948 over Dixiecrat Strom Thurmond. In 2024, Republican Donald Trump won just over 91.4% of the vote in Winston County, the best for any candidate in the county since 1856.

United States presidential election results for Winston County, Alabama
| Year | Republican | | Democratic | | Third party(ies) | |
| Year | No. | % | No. | % | No. | % |
|---|---|---|---|---|---|---|
| 1852 | 9 | 12.16% | 65 | 87.84% | 0 | 0.00% |
| 1856 | 0 | 0.00% | 221 | 94.04% | 14 | 5.96% |
| 1860 | 0 | 0.00% | 147 | 37.69% | 243 | 62.31% |
| 1868 | 284 | 87.93% | 39 | 12.07% | 0 | 0.00% |
| 1872 | 433 | 80.48% | 105 | 19.52% | 0 | 0.00% |
| 1876 | 454 | 65.70% | 237 | 34.30% | 0 | 0.00% |
| 1880 | 126 | 45.82% | 149 | 54.18% | 0 | 0.00% |
| 1884 | 184 | 58.41% | 131 | 41.59% | 0 | 0.00% |
| 1888 | 323 | 59.48% | 220 | 40.52% | 0 | 0.00% |
| 1892 | 2 | 0.18% | 526 | 47.99% | 568 | 51.82% |
| 1896 | 589 | 62.07% | 349 | 36.78% | 11 | 1.16% |
| 1900 | 519 | 47.75% | 539 | 49.59% | 29 | 2.67% |
| 1904 | 789 | 55.21% | 602 | 42.13% | 38 | 2.66% |
| 1908 | 949 | 67.59% | 443 | 31.55% | 12 | 0.85% |
| 1912 | 292 | 17.18% | 508 | 29.88% | 900 | 52.94% |
| 1916 | 1,107 | 59.94% | 727 | 39.36% | 13 | 0.70% |
| 1920 | 2,307 | 68.99% | 1,037 | 31.01% | 0 | 0.00% |
| 1924 | 1,096 | 61.02% | 650 | 36.19% | 50 | 2.78% |
| 1928 | 2,085 | 75.96% | 659 | 24.01% | 1 | 0.04% |
| 1932 | 1,005 | 49.78% | 1,006 | 49.83% | 8 | 0.40% |
| 1936 | 1,428 | 52.77% | 1,270 | 46.93% | 8 | 0.30% |
| 1940 | 1,686 | 54.55% | 1,394 | 45.10% | 11 | 0.36% |
| 1944 | 1,538 | 62.52% | 912 | 37.07% | 10 | 0.41% |
| 1948 | 1,588 | 64.34% | 0 | 0.00% | 880 | 35.66% |
| 1952 | 2,017 | 59.05% | 1,390 | 40.69% | 9 | 0.26% |
| 1956 | 2,998 | 65.60% | 1,570 | 34.35% | 2 | 0.04% |
| 1960 | 3,421 | 67.01% | 1,681 | 32.93% | 3 | 0.06% |
| 1964 | 3,438 | 71.19% | 0 | 0.00% | 1,391 | 28.81% |
| 1968 | 2,174 | 39.33% | 258 | 4.67% | 3,095 | 56.00% |
| 1972 | 4,971 | 86.14% | 779 | 13.50% | 21 | 0.36% |
| 1976 | 3,710 | 47.15% | 4,134 | 52.54% | 24 | 0.31% |
| 1980 | 4,981 | 59.04% | 3,368 | 39.92% | 87 | 1.03% |
| 1984 | 6,845 | 72.22% | 2,624 | 27.69% | 9 | 0.09% |
| 1988 | 6,235 | 67.59% | 2,954 | 32.02% | 36 | 0.39% |
| 1992 | 5,550 | 55.01% | 3,415 | 33.85% | 1,124 | 11.14% |
| 1996 | 4,728 | 54.80% | 3,120 | 36.17% | 779 | 9.03% |
| 2000 | 6,413 | 68.82% | 2,692 | 28.89% | 213 | 2.29% |
| 2004 | 8,130 | 78.00% | 2,236 | 21.45% | 57 | 0.55% |
| 2008 | 8,103 | 80.78% | 1,757 | 17.52% | 171 | 1.70% |
| 2012 | 8,312 | 85.44% | 1,286 | 13.22% | 130 | 1.34% |
| 2016 | 9,228 | 89.48% | 872 | 8.46% | 213 | 2.07% |
| 2020 | 10,195 | 90.35% | 974 | 8.63% | 115 | 1.02% |
| 2024 | 10,191 | 91.41% | 884 | 7.93% | 74 | 0.66% |

United States Senate election results for Winston County, Alabama2
| Year | Republican | | Democratic | | Third party(ies) | |
| Year | No. | % | No. | % | No. | % |
|---|---|---|---|---|---|---|
| 2020 | 9,915 | 88.29% | 1,302 | 11.59% | 13 | 0.12% |

United States Senate election results for Winston County, Alabama3
| Year | Republican | | Democratic | | Third party(ies) | |
| Year | No. | % | No. | % | No. | % |
|---|---|---|---|---|---|---|
| 2022 | 6,309 | 91.40% | 403 | 5.84% | 191 | 2.77% |

Alabama Gubernatorial election results for Winston County
| Year | Republican | | Democratic | | Third party(ies) | |
| Year | No. | % | No. | % | No. | % |
|---|---|---|---|---|---|---|
| 2022 | 6,331 | 91.38% | 344 | 4.97% | 253 | 3.65% |

== Transportation ==
=== Major highways ===
- U.S. Highway 278 / State Route 74 (unsigned)
- State Route 5
- State Route 13
- State Route 33
- State Route 129
- State Route 195
- State Route 243
- State Route 257

=== Rail ===
- Norfolk Southern Railway

== Communities ==
=== City ===
- Haleyville (partly in Marion County)

=== Towns ===
- Addison
- Arley
- Double Springs (county seat)
- Lynn
- Natural Bridge
- Nauvoo (partly in Walker County)

=== Unincorporated communities ===
- Boar Tush
- Delmar
- Glen Mary
- Houston
- Posey Field

=== Ghost towns ===
- Batts Nest
- Corinth

== Notable residents ==
Lawyer and politician Chester Tubb lived and worked in the county, including as its solicitor. Judge Frank Minis Johnson of the U.S. Court of Appeals for the Eleventh Circuit was born in Delmar, in Winston County.

== See also ==
- Winston County Schools
- National Register of Historic Places listings in Winston County, Alabama
- Properties on the Alabama Register of Landmarks and Heritage in Winston County, Alabama
- Fannin County, Georgia, a county with a very similar history to Winston County.
