= Alabama State Route 257 =

State highway in Alabama, United States

State Route 257
- Curry Highway

Route information
- Maintained by ALDOT
- Length: 9.193 mi (14.795 km)

Major junctions
- South end: SR 195 in Jasper
- North end: CR 41 near Curry

Location
- Country: United States
- State: Alabama
- Counties: Walker

Highway system
- Alabama State Highway System; Interstate; US; State
← SR 255	→ SR 259

State Route 257 (SR 257) is a 9.193-mile (14.795 km) route serving as a connection between SR 195 at Jasper to Duncan Bridge in Walker County. Once entering Winston County the route becomes Winston County Road 41 (CR 41). The road is also signed as the Curry Highway.

== Route description ==
The southern terminus of SR 257 is at its intersection with SR 195 northeast of Jasper. From this point, the route takes a northeasterly course as two-lane undivided Curry Highway, passing through wooded areas with some homes. The road leaves Jasper and continues through forested areas with some fields and residences. The route curves north and passes through the community of Curry, where it intersects CR 43. From Curry, SR 257 travels in a northerly direction through more rural areas before curving northwest and coming to its northern terminus at the Winston County line. At this point, the road continues into Winston County as CR 41.

== Major intersections ==
The entire route is in Walker County.

Location	mi	km	Destinations	Notes
Jasper	0.000	0.000	SR 195 – Downtown, Double Springs	Southern terminus
Curry	9.193	14.795	CR 41 north – Arley	Continuation beyond Winston County border; northern terminus
1.000 mi = 1.609 km; 1.000 km = 0.621 mi
