= Glen Mary =

Glen Mary may refer to:

- Glen Mary, Alabama
- Glen Mary (Hancock County, Georgia), an NRHP
- Glen Mary, California, former name of Owensville, California
