= Manchester, Alabama =

- Unincorporated community
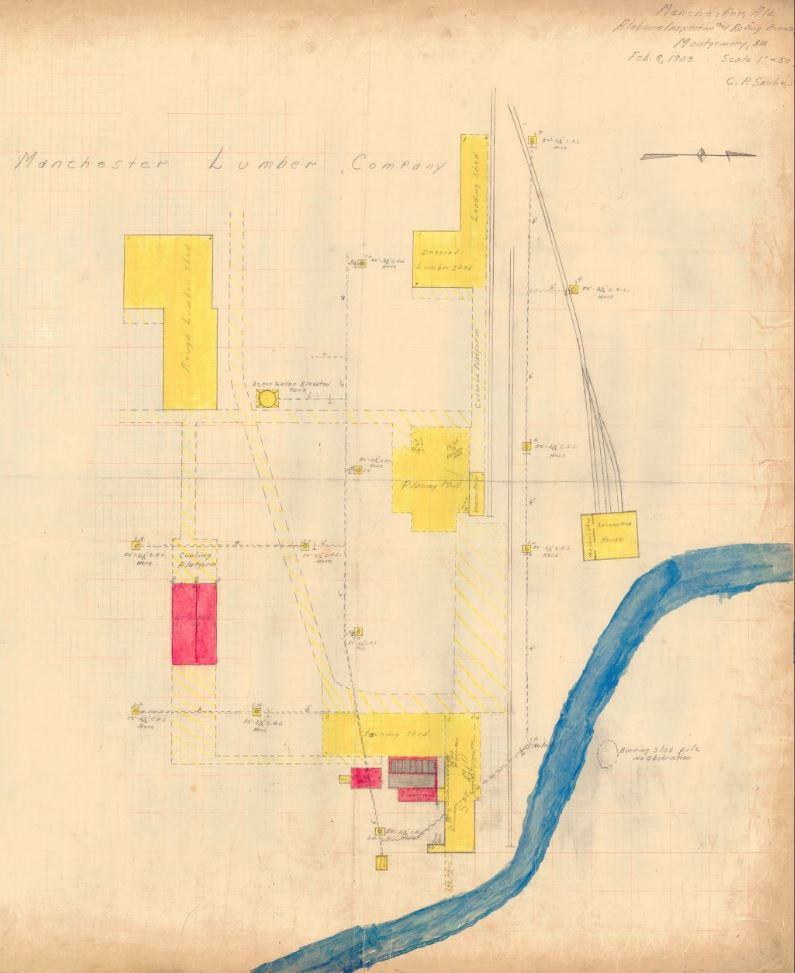
- 1923 fire insurance map of Manchester

- Location within Alabama Location within the United States
- Coordinates: 33°54′23″N 87°18′05″W
- Country: United States
- State: Alabama
- County: Walker
- Elevation: 463 ft (141 m)

Population (2010)
  - Total: 91
- Time zone: UTC-6 (Central (CST))
  - Summer (DST): UTC-5 (CDT)
- Area codes: 205, 659
- GNIS feature ID: 160027

Manchester is an unincorporated community in Walker County, Alabama, United States. Manchester is located along Alabama State Route 195, 6.1 miles (9.8 km) north-northeast of Jasper.

== History ==
Manchester was founded as a lumber center. The Manchester Lumber Company owned a large amount of the surrounding timber land and built a school and Baptist church for the community. Much of the lumber produced in Manchester was used to make flatboats, which were used to transport coal. For a short time, the Manchester Coal Company mined coal in the area.

A post office operated under the name Manchester from 1907 to 1957.

The Walker County Airport is located in Manchester.
