= Archeological Site No. 1WI50 =

Archaeological site in Alabama, United States

- U.S. National Register of Historic Places
- Nearest city: Haleyville, Alabama
- Area: 5 acres (2.0 ha)
- NRHP reference No.: 85003119
- Added to NRHP: December 14, 1985

Archeological Site No. 1WI50 is an archaeological site in the Sipsey Wilderness of the William B. Bankhead National Forest in Winston County, Alabama. It was added to the National Register of Historic Places on December 14, 1985.

The site, spread over 5 acres (2.0 ha), lies between the south bank of the Sipsey Fork of the Black Warrior River and a tall sandstone bluff. Surface remains, believed by archaeologists to be of prehistoric Native American origin, consist of a row of three stone mounds. At the time of the National Register nomination, they individually measured approximately 6.6×13×3.3 feet (2×4×1 m), 9.8×8.2×1.9 feet (3×2×1 m), and 6.6×4.9×1.6 feet (2×1×0.5 m). The mounds are aligned on a north–south axis.

Excavation at the site in 1983 revealed evidence of human occupation during three different cultural periods and covering a time frame spanning from 100 BC to 1000 AD. More than 2000 artifacts were recovered during the excavation. These included lithic and ceramic artifacts belonging to the Alexander phase of the Late Gulf Formational period and to the McKelvey phase of the Late Woodland period of Alabama.
