= Boar Tush, Alabama =

Unincorporated community in Alabama, United States

- Unincorporated community
- Location within Alabama
- Coordinates: 34°11′28″N 87°37′19″W
- Country: United States
- State: Alabama
- County: Winston
- Elevation: 889 ft (271 m)
- Time zone: UTC-6 (Central (CST))
  - Summer (DST): UTC-5 (CDT)
- GNIS feature ID: 151692

Boar Tush is an unincorporated community in Winston County, Alabama, United States. It was also called Boartusk.

A post office was established as Boartush in 1885, and it closed one year later, in 1886.
