= Kinlock Shelter =

Rock shelter and Native American cultural site in Alabama

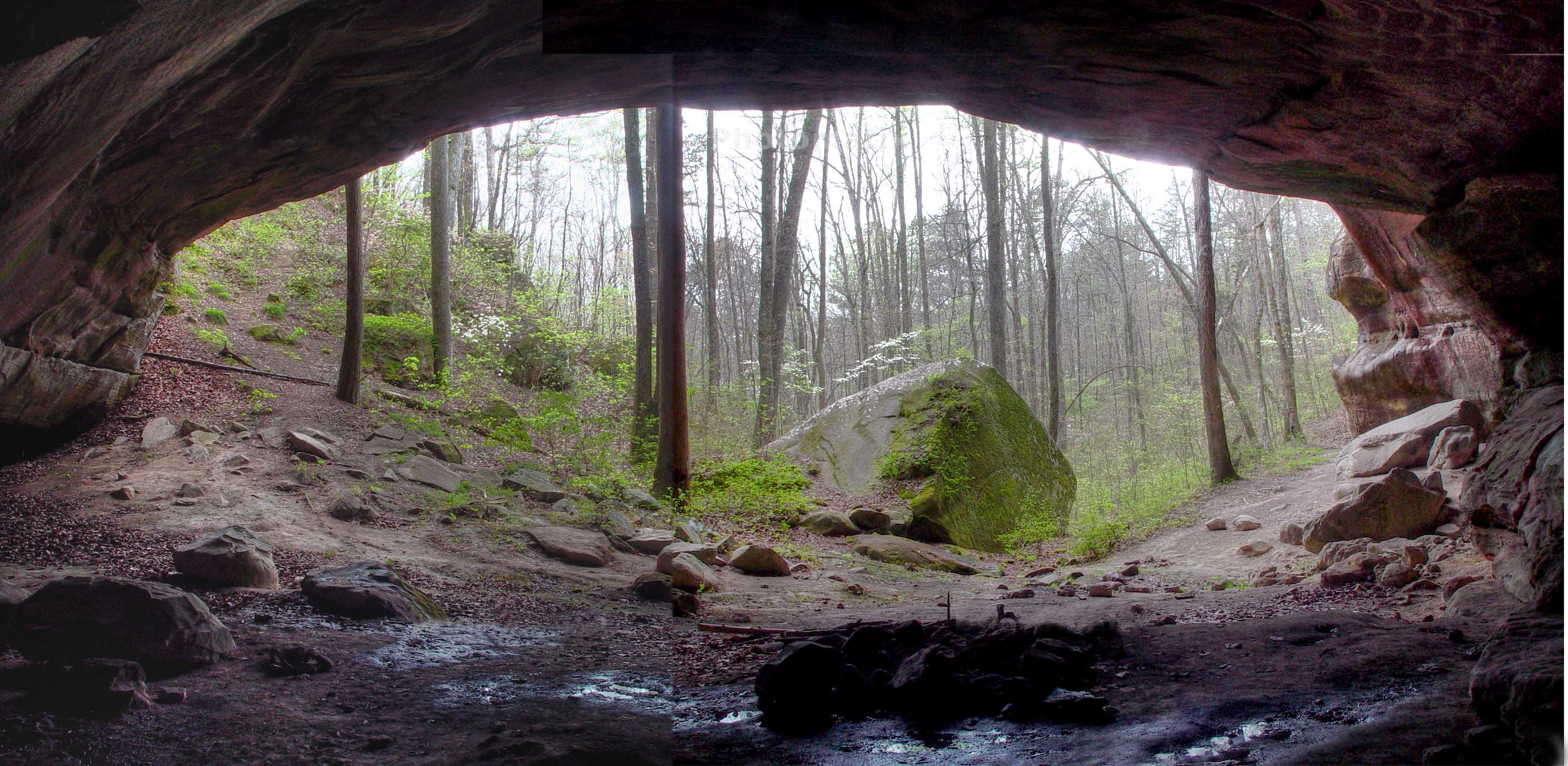
- Panorama of the shelter
- Location: Alabama, United States
- Nearest town: double springs
- Visitors: Visitation Allowed

The Kinlock Shelter is a rock shelter and Native American cultural site located just outside Sipsey Wilderness in Bankhead National Forest, near Double Springs, Alabama. The shelter is located not far from Hubbard Creek, near a former Civilian Conservation Corps work camp off Kinlock Road. The name "Kinlock" is taken from a former plantation nearby.

Kinlock Shelter, occasionally referred to as the Kinlock Antiquities, is the home of a Native American Winter Solstice sunrise ritual. The shelter was first used by the Yuchi Tribe who used the site and the patterns drawn in the rock as part of a trance-inducing process, and for ceremonial acknowledgement of solar cycles. The site has also been used by other tribes, including the Cherokee. It has been used for many thousands of years.

Possession of alcoholic beverages and camping without a written permit from the United States Forest Service is prohibited inside Kinlock Shelter.
