= Batts Nest, Alabama =

- Unincorporated community
- Location within Alabama
- Coordinates: 34°9′16″N 87°36′1″W
- Country: United States
- State: Alabama
- County: Winston
- Elevation: 853 ft (260 m)
- Time zone: UTC-6 (Central (CST))
  - Summer (DST): UTC-5 (CDT)
- GNIS feature ID: 2680792

Batts Nest or Batt's Nest was an unincorporated community in Winston County, Alabama, United States. It is now a ghost town.
