= Charles Martin (Alabama politician) =

American politician

Charles Bee Martin (July 12, 1931 – December 8, 2012) was an American politician.

Martin was born in Curry, Alabama, in Walker County, Alabama, and worked for Monsanto, an agricultural business. From Decatur, Alabama, Martin served on the Decatur city council. He also served in both houses of the Alabama Legislature and on the Alabama Public Service Commission. He died in Decatur, Alabama.
