= Rock shelter =

Shallow cave-like opening at the base of a bluff or cliff

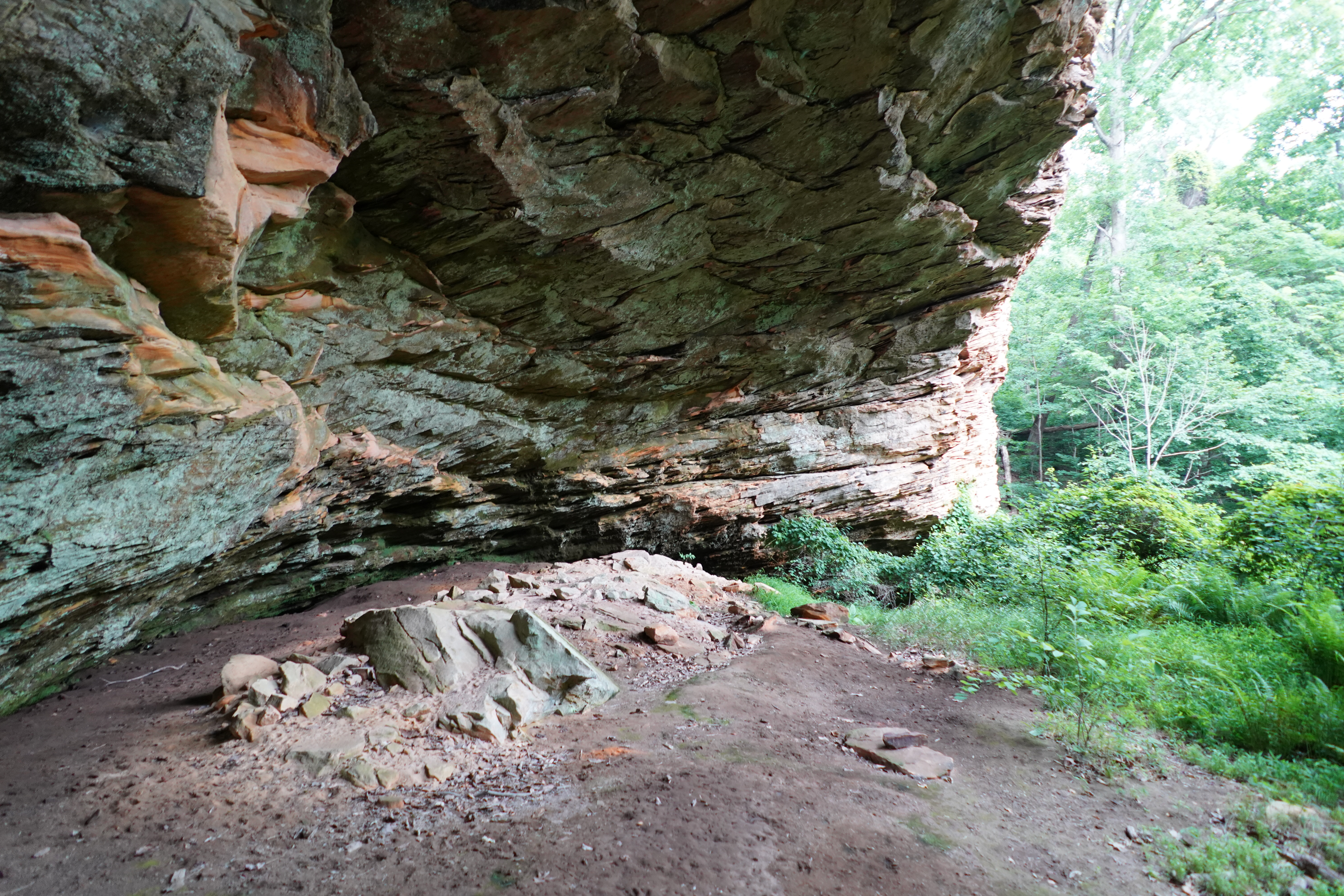
The larger of the two Rockhouse Cliffs Rock Shelters

A rock shelter (also rockhouse, crepuscular cave, bluff shelter, or abri) is a shallow cave-like opening at the base of a bluff or cliff.

== Formation ==
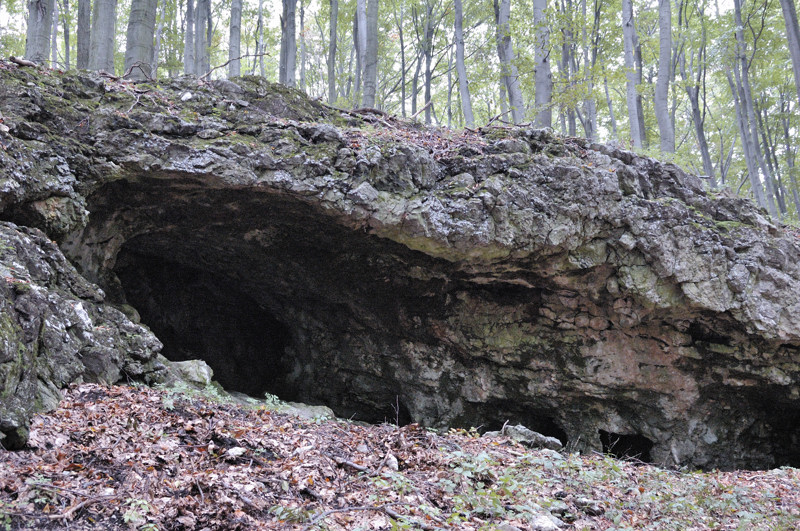
Rock shelter in the Little Carpathians

Rock shelters form because a relatively resistant rock stratum such as sandstone has formed a cliff or bluff, while a softer stratum like shale lies just below and is worn away by erosion (from water flows or wind) and weathering (especially that of frost). Rock shelters can be found behind waterfalls and are typically modest in size compared to deeper formations like solutional caves.

Rock shelter formation types
Frost weathering weakens a rock face.

Water sinks down into soluble rock.

River erosion paves an opening.

== Human habitat ==
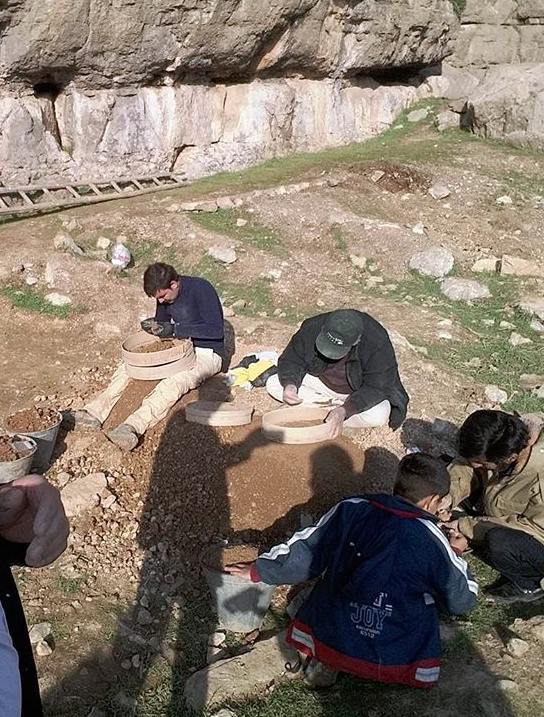
Dig of a Paleolithic site in the Zagros Mountains, Iran

Rock shelters are often important archaeologically. Because rock shelters form natural shelters from the weather, prehistoric humans often used them as living places, leaving behind debris, tools, and other artifacts. Rock shelters in montane areas can be of use to mountaineers.

In western Connecticut and eastern New York, many rock shelters are known by the colloquialism "leatherman caves", as they were inhabited by the Leatherman over three decades in the late 19th century.

== Unique vegetation ==
The Cumberland stitchwort (Minuartia cumberlandensis) is an endangered species of plant which is found only in rock shelters in Kentucky and Tennessee.

== Notable examples ==
- Bhimbetka rock shelters – 30,000+ years old archaeological World Heritage site in Madhya Pradesh, India
- Fincha Habera Rock Shelter – Middle Stone Age archeological site in southern Ethiopia
- Gatecliff Rockshelter – Archaeological site in the Great Basin area of the western United States
- Kinlock Shelter – Rock shelter and Native American cultural site in Alabama
- Mesa Verde National Park – U.S. national park in Colorado
- Roc-aux-Sorciers – Cave and archaeological site with prehistoric art in France
- Schweizersbild – Paleolithic rock shelter in Switzerland
- Shelter Rock – Landmarked rock shelter in Nassau County, New York
- Walnut Canyon National Monument – Protected area in Coconino County, Arizona

== See also ==
- List of caves
- Overhang (architecture)
- Overhang (climbing)
- Rock shed
- Simple dolmen
