= Houston Jail =

- U.S. National Register of Historic Places
- Location within Alabama Location within the United States
- Location: Off U.S. 278 on SR 63; Houston, Alabama
- Coordinates: 34°8′28″N 87°15′27″W
- Area: 0.5 acres (0.20 ha)
- Built: 1868
- NRHP reference No.: 75000331
- Added to NRHP: June 5, 1975

The Houston Jail is a historic jail building in Houston, Alabama. It was added to the National Register of Historic Places on June 5, 1975.

== History ==
The building is the only known surviving log jail in the state and the only public building surviving from the time that the county seat was located in Houston. It is believed by architectural historians to have been built circa 1868, when the now destroyed courthouse is known to have been constructed. Houston was made the seat in 1858, but the minutes from a grand jury meeting in 1867 reported the need to build a courthouse and a jail. The county seat was moved to Double Springs in 1884, resulting in Houston shrinking to the small unincorporated community that it is today.

It was converted into a residence for the poor in 1933, with the original split shake roof replaced with one of galvanized metal at this time. The roof has since been restored back to shakes.

== Architecture ==
The jail is built of large squared logs joined by half notched corners. It measures 20 by 20 feet (6.1 m × 6.1 m) with a front gabled roof. The interior is divided into two rooms with an interlocking log wall. A fully raised foundation of fieldstone supports the structure. The cell's interior features continuous boards, turned at right angles to the logs and secured in place with 2.5-inch (6.4 cm) wooden nails to prevent prisoners from sawing their way out. Likewise, the ceiling is formed by closely spaced 10 by 10 inches (25 cm × 25 cm) logs and the floor is plank over similarly spaced 10 by 6 inches (25 cm × 15 cm) logs. The small square windows originally featured meshed iron bars. The original door was made of three solid layers of 1.5-inch (3.8 cm) plank boards laid at angles to one another.
