= 1916 United States presidential election in Alabama =

- November 7, 1916

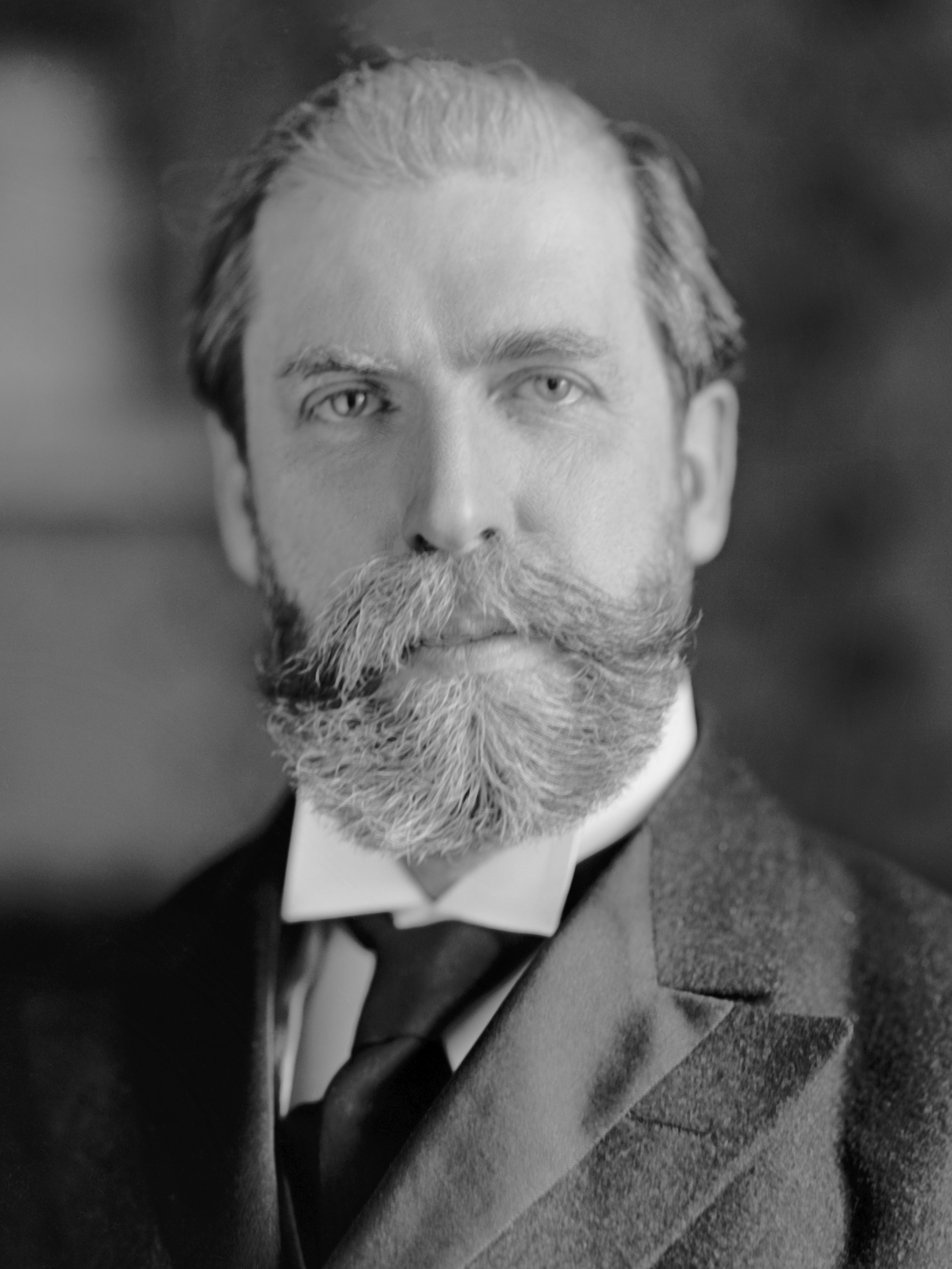
| Nominee | Woodrow Wilson | Charles E. Hughes |
| Party | Democratic | Republican |
| Home state | New Jersey | New York |
| Running mate | Thomas R. Marshall | Charles W. Fairbanks |
| Electoral vote | 12 | 0 |
| Popular vote | 99,409 | 28,662 |
| Percentage | 76.04% | 21.92% |
County results
Wilson
50–60%
60–70%
70–80%
80–90%
90–100%
Hughes
50–60%
President before election
Woodrow Wilson
Democratic
Elected President
Woodrow Wilson
Democratic

The 1916 United States presidential election in Alabama took place on November 7, 1916, as part of the nationwide presidential election. State voters chose twelve representatives, or electors, to the Electoral College, who voted for president and vice president.

Since the 1890s, Alabama had been effectively a one-party state ruled by the Democratic Party. Disenfranchisement of almost all African-Americans and a large proportion of poor whites via poll taxes, literacy tests and extralegal violence had essentially eliminated opposition parties outside of Unionist Winston County and a few nearby northern hill counties that had been Populist strongholds. The only competitive statewide elections became Democratic Party primaries that were limited by law to white voters.

Unlike the other Deep South states, however, soon after black disenfranchisement Alabama's white Republicans made rapid efforts to expel blacks from the state Republican Party. For the 1904 Convention, President Theodore Roosevelt rejected this proposal, unlike in North Carolina where he acquiesced without opposition to the demands of Jeter Connelly Pritchard. Oscar D. Street was appointed state party boss as part of the pro-Taft “black and tan” faction in 1912, while Roosevelt planned “lily-whitism” for the South with his “Bull Moose” party after he broke from the GOP. Roosevelt's personal popularity even in the overwhelmingly Democratic Deep South meant he easily outpolled Taft in the region, and in Alabama this led the pro-Taft Street to move the state GOP in a lily-white direction much earlier than any other Deep South state.

With President Wilson still popular, however, the shift to a lily-white Republican Party would have no effect on Alabama's presidential voting. An early poll in August saw incumbent President Woodrow Wilson (D–New Jersey), running with incumbent Vice President Thomas R. Marshall, with 24 votes, against Associate Justice of the U.S. Supreme Court Charles Evans Hughes (R–New York), running with former Vice President Charles W. Fairbanks, with five votes. All later forecasts showed the state going to Wilson, and in the end the small August poll proved fairly accurate, with Wilson winning 76.04 percent of the vote to Hughes’ 21.92 percent. Wilson carried all but three counties, and his appeal to Progressive former Populists allowed him to carry one of the four counties — Cullman — that the “Bull Moose” party had won in 1912.

== Results ==
1916 United States presidential election in Alabama
| Party | Candidate | Votes | % |
|---|---|---|---|
| Democratic | Woodrow Wilson (incumbent) | 99,409 | 76.04% |
| Republican | Charles Evans Hughes | 28,662 | 21.92% |
| Socialist | Allan L. Benson | 1,916 | 1.47% |
| Prohibition | Frank Hanly | 741 | 0.57% |
| Total votes | | 129,987 | 100.00% |

=== Results by county ===
| County | Woodrow Wilson Democratic | | Charles Evans Hughes Republican | | Allan L. Benson Socialist | | Frank Hanly Prohibition | | Margin | | Total votes cast |
| County | # | % | # | % | # | % | # | % | # | % | Total votes cast |
|---|---|---|---|---|---|---|---|---|---|---|---|
| Autauga | 773 | 87.05% | 99 | 11.15% | 11 | 1.24% | 5 | 0.56% | 674 | 75.90% | 888 |
| Baldwin | 766 | 67.19% | 216 | 18.95% | 148 | 12.98% | 10 | 0.88% | 550 | 48.25% | 1,140 |
| Barbour | 1,235 | 94.64% | 45 | 3.45% | 13 | 1.00% | 12 | 0.92% | 1,190 | 91.19% | 1,305 |
| Bibb | 1,247 | 78.58% | 217 | 13.67% | 106 | 6.68% | 17 | 1.07% | 1,030 | 64.90% | 1,587 |
| Blount | 1,488 | 54.13% | 1,229 | 44.71% | 26 | 0.95% | 6 | 0.22% | 259 | 9.42% | 2,749 |
| Bullock | 743 | 99.20% | 4 | 0.53% | 2 | 0.27% | 0 | 0.00% | 739 | 98.66% | 749 |
| Butler | 1,162 | 93.03% | 78 | 6.24% | 6 | 0.48% | 3 | 0.24% | 1,084 | 86.79% | 1,249 |
| Calhoun | 2,231 | 81.81% | 442 | 16.21% | 29 | 1.06% | 25 | 0.92% | 1,789 | 65.60% | 2,727 |
| Chambers | 1,679 | 89.88% | 168 | 8.99% | 7 | 0.37% | 14 | 0.75% | 1,511 | 80.89% | 1,868 |
| Cherokee | 1,136 | 67.78% | 508 | 30.31% | 27 | 1.61% | 5 | 0.30% | 628 | 37.47% | 1,676 |
| Chilton | 881 | 38.34% | 1,363 | 59.31% | 40 | 1.74% | 14 | 0.61% | -482 | -20.97% | 2,298 |
| Choctaw | 765 | 95.63% | 21 | 2.63% | 12 | 1.50% | 2 | 0.25% | 744 | 93.00% | 800 |
| Clarke | 1,397 | 97.42% | 25 | 1.74% | 12 | 0.84% | 0 | 0.00% | 1,372 | 95.68% | 1,434 |
| Clay | 1,196 | 63.72% | 677 | 36.07% | 1 | 0.05% | 3 | 0.16% | 519 | 27.65% | 1,877 |
| Cleburne | 760 | 56.21% | 578 | 42.75% | 5 | 0.37% | 9 | 0.67% | 182 | 13.46% | 1,352 |
| Coffee | 2,029 | 81.95% | 426 | 17.21% | 17 | 0.69% | 4 | 0.16% | 1,603 | 64.74% | 2,476 |
| Colbert | 1,132 | 74.04% | 352 | 23.02% | 44 | 2.88% | 1 | 0.07% | 780 | 51.01% | 1,529 |
| Conecuh | 1,036 | 94.44% | 42 | 3.83% | 17 | 1.55% | 2 | 0.18% | 994 | 90.61% | 1,097 |
| Coosa | 867 | 62.42% | 485 | 34.92% | 34 | 2.45% | 3 | 0.22% | 382 | 27.50% | 1,389 |
| Covington | 1,738 | 79.94% | 305 | 14.03% | 107 | 4.92% | 24 | 1.10% | 1,433 | 65.92% | 2,174 |
| Crenshaw | 1,427 | 90.43% | 139 | 8.81% | 5 | 0.32% | 7 | 0.44% | 1,288 | 81.62% | 1,578 |
| Cullman | 1,396 | 50.52% | 1,351 | 48.90% | 9 | 0.33% | 7 | 0.25% | 45 | 1.63% | 2,763 |
| Dale | 1,260 | 67.38% | 597 | 31.93% | 4 | 0.21% | 9 | 0.48% | 663 | 35.45% | 1,870 |
| Dallas | 1,565 | 97.87% | 23 | 1.44% | 7 | 0.44% | 4 | 0.25% | 1,542 | 96.44% | 1,599 |
| DeKalb | 1,787 | 59.09% | 1,190 | 39.35% | 33 | 1.09% | 14 | 0.46% | 597 | 19.74% | 3,024 |
| Elmore | 1,631 | 99.57% | 0 | 0.00% | 0 | 0.00% | 7 | 0.43% | 1,624 (Note: In this county where Hanly ran second ahead of Hughes, margin given is Wilson vote minus Hanly vote and percentage margin Wilson percentage minus Hanly percentage.) | 99.15% | 1,638 |
| Escambia | 982 | 89.84% | 108 | 9.88% | 3 | 0.27% | 0 | 0.00% | 874 | 79.96% | 1,093 |
| Etowah | 1,883 | 66.65% | 862 | 30.51% | 73 | 2.58% | 7 | 0.25% | 1,021 | 36.14% | 2,825 |
| Fayette | 1,026 | 58.43% | 697 | 39.69% | 18 | 1.03% | 15 | 0.85% | 329 | 18.74% | 1,756 |
| Franklin | 1,044 | 50.34% | 984 | 47.44% | 39 | 1.88% | 7 | 0.34% | 60 | 2.89% | 2,074 |
| Geneva | 1,265 | 62.84% | 713 | 35.42% | 23 | 1.14% | 12 | 0.60% | 552 | 27.42% | 2,013 |
| Greene | 383 | 97.70% | 9 | 2.30% | 0 | 0.00% | 0 | 0.00% | 374 | 95.41% | 392 |
| Hale | 795 | 97.79% | 15 | 1.85% | 1 | 0.12% | 2 | 0.25% | 780 | 95.94% | 813 |
| Henry | 860 | 83.25% | 141 | 13.65% | 27 | 2.61% | 5 | 0.48% | 719 | 69.60% | 1,033 |
| Houston | 1,670 | 76.05% | 466 | 21.22% | 46 | 2.09% | 14 | 0.64% | 1,204 | 54.83% | 2,196 |
| Jackson | 1,907 | 75.61% | 567 | 22.48% | 32 | 1.27% | 16 | 0.63% | 1,340 | 53.13% | 2,522 |
| Jefferson | 10,677 | 81.38% | 2,052 | 15.64% | 296 | 2.26% | 95 | 0.72% | 8,625 | 65.74% | 13,120 |
| Lamar | 1,299 | 79.45% | 303 | 18.53% | 4 | 0.24% | 29 | 1.77% | 996 | 60.92% | 1,635 |
| Lauderdale | 1,678 | 79.64% | 369 | 17.51% | 47 | 2.23% | 13 | 0.62% | 1,309 | 62.13% | 2,107 |
| Lawrence | 995 | 85.92% | 43 | 3.71% | 4 | 0.35% | 116 | 10.02% | 879 | 75.91% | 1,158 |
| Lee | 1,369 | 94.67% | 42 | 2.90% | 30 | 2.07% | 5 | 0.35% | 1,327 | 91.77% | 1,446 |
| Limestone | 1,450 | 92.12% | 92 | 5.84% | 19 | 1.21% | 13 | 0.83% | 1,358 | 86.28% | 1,574 |
| Lowndes | 540 | 98.00% | 9 | 1.63% | 1 | 0.18% | 1 | 0.18% | 531 | 96.37% | 551 |
| Macon | 575 | 92.59% | 43 | 6.92% | 2 | 0.32% | 1 | 0.16% | 532 | 85.67% | 621 |
| Madison | 2,206 | 89.17% | 215 | 8.69% | 45 | 1.82% | 8 | 0.32% | 1,991 | 80.48% | 2,474 |
| Marengo | 1,491 | 98.61% | 19 | 1.26% | 1 | 0.07% | 1 | 0.07% | 1,472 | 97.35% | 1,512 |
| Marion | 1,325 | 61.89% | 807 | 37.69% | 1 | 0.05% | 8 | 0.37% | 518 | 24.19% | 2,141 |
| Marshall | 1,944 | 61.32% | 1,183 | 37.32% | 33 | 1.04% | 10 | 0.32% | 761 | 24.01% | 3,170 |
| Mobile | 2,968 | 76.18% | 832 | 21.36% | 75 | 1.93% | 21 | 0.54% | 2,136 | 54.83% | 3,896 |
| Monroe | 1,029 | 98.09% | 17 | 1.62% | 2 | 0.19% | 1 | 0.10% | 1,012 | 96.47% | 1,049 |
| Montgomery | 3,316 | 96.06% | 106 | 3.07% | 19 | 0.55% | 11 | 0.32% | 3,210 | 92.99% | 3,452 |
| Morgan | 2,120 | 82.62% | 364 | 14.19% | 44 | 1.71% | 38 | 1.48% | 1,756 | 68.43% | 2,566 |
| Perry | 895 | 96.44% | 20 | 2.16% | 12 | 1.29% | 1 | 0.11% | 875 | 94.29% | 928 |
| Pickens | 1,179 | 83.09% | 218 | 15.36% | 18 | 1.27% | 4 | 0.28% | 961 | 67.72% | 1,419 |
| Pike | 1,789 | 96.39% | 50 | 2.69% | 11 | 0.59% | 6 | 0.32% | 1,739 | 93.70% | 1,856 |
| Randolph | 1,324 | 66.70% | 652 | 32.85% | 4 | 0.20% | 5 | 0.25% | 672 | 33.85% | 1,985 |
| Russell | 752 | 99.08% | 3 | 0.40% | 4 | 0.53% | 0 | 0.00% | 748 (Note: In this county where Benson ran second ahead of Hughes, margin given is Wilson vote minus Benson vote and percentage margin Wilson percentage minus Benson percentage.) | 98.55% | 759 |
| St. Clair | 987 | 51.97% | 851 | 44.81% | 53 | 2.79% | 8 | 0.42% | 136 | 7.16% | 1,899 |
| Shelby | 1,311 | 47.57% | 1,428 | 51.81% | 8 | 0.29% | 9 | 0.33% | -117 | -4.25% | 2,756 |
| Sumter | 770 | 98.21% | 8 | 1.02% | 6 | 0.77% | 0 | 0.00% | 762 | 97.19% | 784 |
| Talladega | 1,539 | 77.10% | 447 | 22.39% | 4 | 0.20% | 6 | 0.30% | 1,092 | 54.71% | 1,996 |
| Tallapoosa | 1,892 | 91.98% | 129 | 6.27% | 33 | 1.60% | 3 | 0.15% | 1,763 | 85.71% | 2,057 |
| Tuscaloosa | 2,437 | 89.99% | 218 | 8.05% | 41 | 1.51% | 12 | 0.44% | 2,219 | 81.94% | 2,708 |
| Walker | 2,314 | 53.80% | 1,860 | 43.25% | 107 | 2.49% | 20 | 0.47% | 454 | 10.56% | 4,301 |
| Washington | 500 | 92.94% | 32 | 5.95% | 2 | 0.37% | 4 | 0.74% | 468 | 86.99% | 538 |
| Wilcox | 866 | 99.88% | 1 | 0.12% | 0 | 0.00% | 0 | 0.00% | 865 | 99.77% | 867 |
| Winston | 727 | 39.36% | 1,107 | 59.94% | 6 | 0.32% | 7 | 0.38% | -380 | -20.57% | 1,847 |
| Totals | 99,409 | 76.04% | 28,662 | 21.92% | 1,916 | 1.47% | 741 | 0.57% | 70,747 | 54.12% | 130,728 |

== See also ==
- United States presidential elections in Alabama
