= Posey Field, Alabama =

Unincorporated community in Alabama, United States

Coordinates: 34.3146°N 87.5878°W

Posey Field is an unincorporated community located in Winston County, Alabama, United States. The community was founded c. 1950 and has a population of 74.

== Posey Field Airport ==
The Posey Field Airport is located in the community. The airport was named after a former Winston County politician.

== Religion ==
Two churches are located within the Posey Mills community, Posey Mills Baptist Church and Sunny Home Baptist Church.

== Services ==
The Posey Field community is located within Winston County. Therefore, county garbage pickup is provided. The community is served by the Haleyville Fire Department and the Pebble Volunteer Fire Department.

Some of the community is also in Franklin County, including Posey Mill Baptist Church and adjoining cemetery.

== Notable people ==
- Pat Buttram, Green Acres star
- Jake Hess, gospel musician
