= 1912 United States presidential election in Alabama =

- November 5, 1912

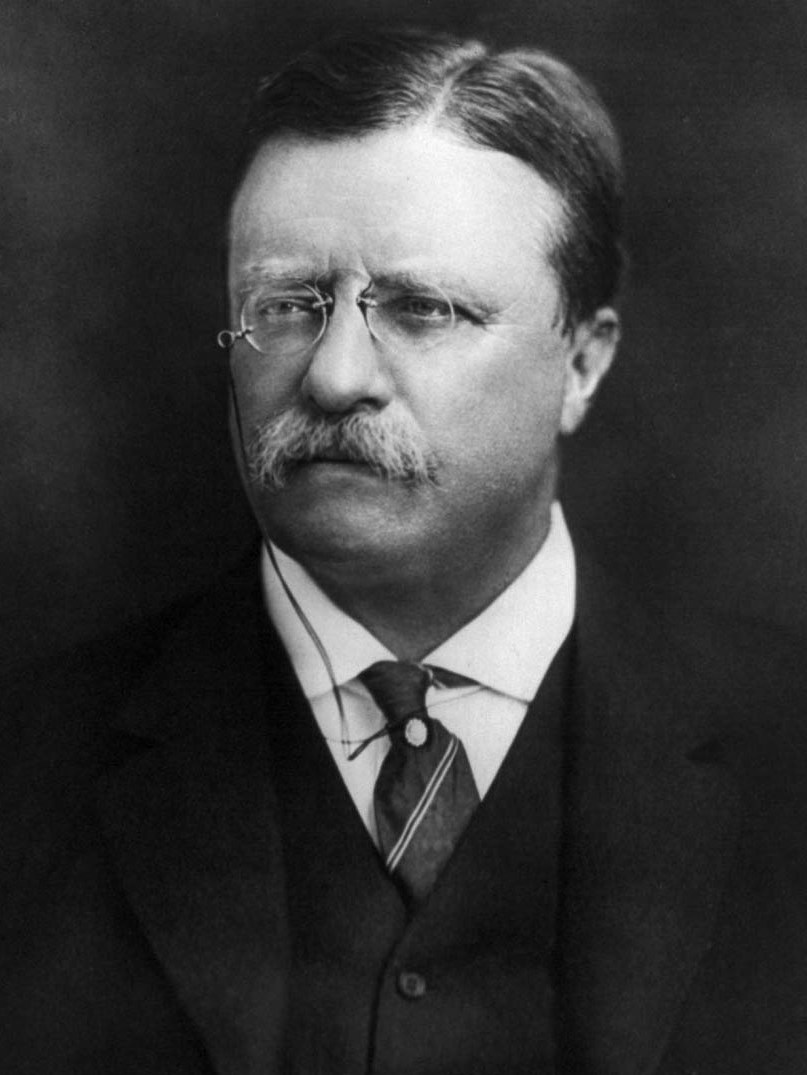

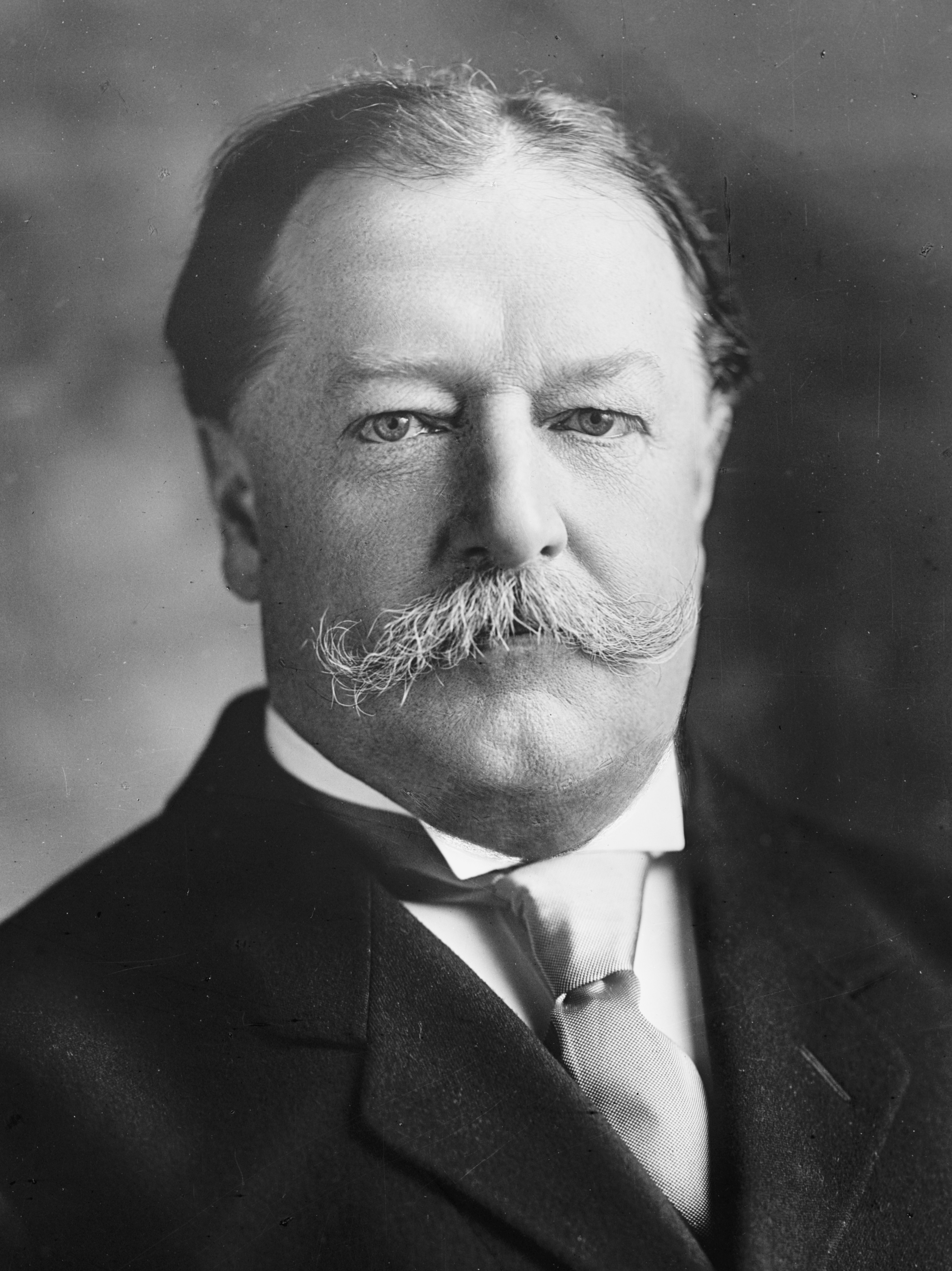
Nominee	Woodrow Wilson	Theodore Roosevelt	William Howard Taft
Party	Democratic	Progressive	Republican
Home state	New Jersey	New York	Ohio
Running mate	Thomas R. Marshall	Hiram Johnson	Nicholas M. Butler
Electoral vote	12	0	0
Popular vote	82,438	22,680	9,717
Percentage	69.94%	19.24%	8.24%
County results
Wilson
40–50%
50–60%
60–70%
70–80%
80–90%
90–100%
Roosevelt
40–50%
50–60%
President before election
William Howard Taft
Republican
Elected President
Woodrow Wilson
Democratic

The 1912 United States presidential election in Alabama took place on November 5, 1912, as part of the 1912 United States presidential election. Alabama voters chose twelve representatives, or electors, to the Electoral College, who voted for president and vice president.

Over the preceding twenty years, Alabama had become effectively a one-party state ruled by the Democratic Party. Disenfranchisement of almost all African Americans and a large proportion of poor whites via poll taxes, literacy tests and extralegal violence had essentially eliminated opposition parties outside of Unionist Winston County and a few other northern hill counties that had been Populist strongholds. The only competitive statewide elections became Democratic Party primaries limited by law to white voters.

Because the supporters of the Populist Party had previously been frequently lily-white Republicans, and Alabama had the most substantial white Republican support in the Deep South, Alabama's white Republicans would after the 1901 constitutional convention immediately make efforts to expel blacks from the state Republican Party. For the 1904 Convention, President Theodore Roosevelt rejected this proposal, unlike in North Carolina where he acquiesced without opposition to the demands of Jeter Connelly Pritchard. During the rest of the decade, as conservative Democratic rule was consolidated throughout the state, the party did shift toward a more progressive policy, although African-American convict labour was increased in the coalfields near Birmingham during strikes late in the decade.

In the election year of 1912, Oscar D. Street was appointed state Republican Party boss as part of the black-and-tan faction loyal to incumbent president William Howard Taft and Columbia University President Nicholas Murray Butler. At the same time, Theodore Roosevelt and governor of California Hiram Johnson planned “lily-whitism” for the South with the “Bull Moose Party” after Roosevelt broke from the GOP.

No polls were taken in the state during the election season, and despite Roosevelt's popularity even in the Solid South, Democratic nominees former Princeton University President and governor of New Jersey Woodrow Wilson and governor of Indiana Thomas R. Marshall won Alabama easily with 69.94% of the popular vote, against the 26th president of the United States, with 19.24 percent to Roosevelt and 8.24 percent to Taft.

== Results ==
1912 United States presidential election in Alabama
Party	Candidate	Votes	%
Democratic	Woodrow Wilson	82,438	69.94%
Progressive	Theodore Roosevelt	22,680	19.24%
Republican	William Howard Taft (incumbent)	9,717	8.24%
Socialist	Eugene V. Debs	3,029	2.57%
Independent	Write-in	5	0.00%
Total votes		117,869	100%

=== Results by county ===
1912 United States presidential election in Alabama by county
County	Thomas Woodrow Wilson Democratic		William Howard Taft Republican		Theodore Roosevelt Progressive "Bull Moose"		Eugene Victor Debs Socialist		Margin (Note: Because Roosevelt finished ahead of Taft in Alabama as a whole, all margins given are Wilson minus Roosevelt unless stated in the total for the county in question.)		Total votes cast
County	#	%	#	%	#	%	#	%	#	%	Total votes cast
Autauga	622	73.35%	43	5.07%	127	14.98%	56	6.60%	495	58.37%	848
Baldwin	623	67.28%	37	4.00%	141	15.23%	125	13.50%	482	52.05%	926
Barbour	1,155	90.38%	18	1.41%	88	6.89%	17	1.33%	1,067	83.49%	1,278
Bibb	820	71.87%	40	3.51%	178	15.60%	103	9.03%	642	56.27%	1,141
Blount	1,121	48.74%	567	24.65%	580	25.22%	32	1.39%	541	23.52%	2,300
Bullock	736	99.19%	4	0.54%	2	0.27%	0	0.00%	732 (Note: In this county where Taft did run second ahead of Roosevelt, the margin given is that between Wilson and Taft.)	98.65%	742
Butler	903	83.00%	86	7.90%	80	7.35%	19	1.75%	817	75.09%	1,088
Calhoun	1,666	70.62%	238	10.09%	423	17.93%	32	1.36%	1,243	52.69%	2,359
Chambers	1,486	90.83%	28	1.71%	113	6.91%	9	0.55%	1,373	83.92%	1,636
Cherokee	814	46.57%	88	5.03%	799	45.71%	47	2.69%	15	0.86%	1,748
Chilton	880	39.18%	140	6.23%	1,154	51.38%	72	3.21%	-274	-12.20%	2,246
Choctaw	489	86.40%	7	1.24%	66	11.66%	4	0.71%	423	74.73%	566
Clarke	1,024	95.34%	13	1.21%	12	1.12%	25	2.33%	999 (Note: In this county where Debs ran second ahead of both Roosevelt and Taft, the margin given is that between Wilson and Debs.)	93.02%	1,074
Clay	1,109	52.46%	64	3.03%	939	44.42%	2	0.09%	170	8.04%	2,114
Cleburne	691	51.72%	133	9.96%	510	38.17%	2	0.15%	181	13.55%	1,336
Coffee	1,277	70.67%	68	3.76%	395	21.86%	67	3.71%	882	48.81%	1,807
Colbert	946	63.28%	228	15.25%	242	16.19%	79	5.28%	704	47.09%	1,495
Conecuh	802	80.93%	60	6.05%	103	10.39%	26	2.62%	699	70.53%	991
Coosa	763	63.27%	109	9.04%	317	26.29%	17	1.41%	446	36.98%	1,206
Covington	1,251	73.54%	110	6.47%	147	8.64%	193	11.35%	1,058	62.20%	1,701
Crenshaw	986	84.49%	47	4.03%	127	10.88%	7	0.60%	859	73.61%	1,167
Cullman	1,230	42.49%	264	9.12%	1,374	47.46%	27	0.93%	-144	-4.97%	2,895
Dale	1,059	66.02%	99	6.17%	443	27.62%	3	0.19%	616	38.40%	1,604
Dallas	1,461	96.69%	16	1.06%	18	1.19%	16	1.06%	1,443	95.50%	1,511
DeKalb	1,379	54.61%	492	19.49%	623	24.67%	31	1.23%	756	29.94%	2,525
Elmore	1,152	81.70%	81	5.74%	167	11.84%	10	0.71%	985	69.86%	1,410
Escambia	829	85.64%	52	5.37%	74	7.64%	13	1.34%	755	78.00%	968
Etowah	1,511	52.18%	354	12.22%	887	30.63%	144	4.97%	624	21.55%	2,896
Fayette	762	50.07%	434	28.52%	306	20.11%	20	1.31%	328	21.55%	1,522
Franklin	849	47.09%	309	17.14%	570	31.61%	75	4.16%	279	15.47%	1,803
Geneva	891	57.93%	99	6.44%	511	33.22%	37	2.41%	380	24.71%	1,538
Greene	418	81.01%	4	0.78%	94	18.22%	0	0.00%	324	62.79%	516
Hale	720	98.50%	4	0.55%	7	0.96%	0	0.00%	713	97.54%	731
Henry	711	75.88%	47	5.02%	153	16.33%	26	2.77%	558	59.55%	937
Houston	1,160	70.18%	82	4.96%	366	22.14%	45	2.72%	794	48.03%	1,653
Jackson	1,597	70.82%	229	10.16%	406	18.00%	23	1.02%	1,191	52.82%	2,255
Jefferson	8,887	72.69%	693	5.67%	2,034	16.64%	612	5.01%	6,853	56.05%	12,226
Lamar	816	77.94%	61	5.83%	160	15.28%	10	0.96%	656	62.66%	1,047
Lauderdale	1,386	68.68%	263	13.03%	297	14.72%	72	3.57%	1,089	53.96%	2,018
Lawrence	643	56.70%	198	17.46%	261	23.02%	32	2.82%	382	33.69%	1,134
Lee	1,179	88.98%	43	3.25%	43	3.25%	60	4.53%	1,119	84.45%	1,325
Limestone	1,012	83.02%	90	7.38%	83	6.81%	34	2.79%	922	75.64%	1,219
Lowndes	583	97.00%	4	0.67%	10	1.66%	4	0.67%	573	95.34%	601
Macon	647	93.23%	24	3.46%	23	3.31%	0	0.00%	623	89.77%	694
Madison	2,146	78.21%	150	5.47%	357	13.01%	91	3.32%	1,789	65.20%	2,744
Marengo	1,386	97.88%	9	0.64%	20	1.41%	1	0.07%	1,366	96.47%	1,416
Marion	1,098	65.05%	378	22.39%	205	12.14%	7	0.41%	720	42.65%	1,688
Marshall	1,457	47.11%	428	13.84%	1,184	38.28%	24	0.78%	273	8.83%	3,093
Mobile	3,009	79.98%	140	3.72%	445	11.83%	168	4.47%	2,564	68.16%	3,762
Monroe	878	97.12%	2	0.22%	21	2.32%	3	0.33%	857	94.80%	904
Montgomery	3,047	94.10%	43	1.33%	131	4.05%	17	0.53%	2,916	90.06%	3,238
Morgan	1,686	71.11%	241	10.16%	362	15.27%	82	3.46%	1,324	55.84%	2,371
Perry	731	93.84%	3	0.39%	31	3.98%	14	1.80%	700	89.86%	779
Pickens	815	88.01%	22	2.38%	73	7.88%	16	1.73%	742	80.13%	926
Pike	1,293	95.14%	13	0.96%	48	3.53%	5	0.37%	1,245	91.61%	1,359
Randolph	1,177	64.99%	268	14.80%	366	20.21%	0	0.00%	811	44.78%	1,811
Russell	1,553	96.22%	4	0.25%	35	2.17%	22	1.36%	1,518	94.05%	1,614
Shelby	1,181	44.45%	201	7.56%	1,233	46.41%	42	1.58%	-52	-1.96%	2,657
St. Clair	787	43.50%	260	14.37%	687	37.98%	75	4.15%	100	5.53%	1,809
Sumter	701	97.09%	9	1.25%	2	0.28%	10	1.39%	691	95.71%	722
Talladega	1,312	72.49%	111	6.13%	386	21.33%	1	0.06%	926	51.16%	1,810
Tallapoosa	1,586	86.06%	84	4.56%	151	8.19%	22	1.19%	1,435	77.86%	1,843
Tuscaloosa	1,695	85.22%	87	4.37%	158	7.94%	49	2.46%	1,537	77.28%	1,989
Walker	2,063	57.71%	881	24.64%	504	14.10%	127	3.55%	1,182	33.06%	3,575
Washington	405	90.20%	14	3.12%	18	4.01%	12	2.67%	387	86.19%	449
Wilcox	878	97.77%	7	0.78%	7	0.78%	6	0.67%	871	96.99%	898
Winston	508	29.88%	292	17.18%	893	52.53%	7	0.41%	-385	-22.65%	1,700
Totals	82,438	69.89%	9,717	8.24%	22,770 (Note: For the Roosevelt ticket only, there are differences between the Géoelections/Edgar Eugene Robinson figure and that from Dave Leip’s Atlas, with the former used only for the county table.)	19.30%	3,029	2.57%	59,668	50.59%	117,954

== See also ==
- United States presidential elections in Alabama
