= Feldman's Department Store =

- U.S. National Register of Historic Places
- Alabama Register of Landmarks and Heritage
- Location within Alabama Location within the United States
- Location: 800 20th St., Haleyville, Alabama
- Coordinates: 34°13′35″N 87°37′30″W
- Area: 0.3 acres (0.12 ha)
- Built: 1911
- Architectural style: Early Commercial, Two-part Commercial Block
- NRHP reference No.: 09000607

Significant dates
- Added to NRHP: August 12, 2009
- Designated ARLH: September 28, 2004

Feldman's Department Store, currently known as The Downtown Exchange, is a historic commercial building in Haleyville, Alabama. It was added to the National Register of Historic Places on August 12, 2009.

== History ==
Feldman's, now known as The Downtown Exchange, is a two-story brick building that was completed in 1911 for John Dodd. It was the first brick building, and is the oldest surviving commercial building, in Haleyville. The building was purchased by Moses Feldman in 1914. He and his wife, Fanny Royal, were both Eastern European Jewish immigrants to the United States. They purchased Dodd's building in order to open a department store in the rapidly expanding town. The store occupied the entire first floor, with assorted professional and business offices housed on the second. The Feldmans' son Abe joined the business during the 1930s. The department store operated into the late 1990s, closing upon the death of the Feldmans' youngest son David.
