= Haleyville, Alabama =

City in Alabama, United States

- City
- Seal

- Location in Marion County and Winston County, Alabama.
- Coordinates: 34°13′48″N 87°37′08″W
- Country: United States
- State: Alabama
- Counties: Winston, Marion

Government
  - Mayor: Ken Sunseri

Area
  - Total: 8.43 sq mi (21.8 km^{2})
  - Land: 8.38 sq mi (21.7 km^{2})
  - Water: 0.05 sq mi (0.13 km^{2})
- Elevation: 965 ft (294 m)

Population (2020)
  - Total: 4,361
  - Density: 520.22/sq mi (200.86/km^{2})
- Time zone: UTC-6 (Central (CST))
  - Summer (DST): UTC-5 (CDT)
- ZIP code: 35565
- Area codes: 205, 659
- FIPS code: 01-32704
- GNIS feature ID: 2403782
- Website: www.cityofhaleyville.com

Haleyville is a city in Winston and Marion counties in the U.S. state of Alabama. It incorporated on February 28, 1889. Most of the city is located in Winston County, with a small portion of the western limits entering Marion County. Haleyville was originally named "Davis Cross Roads", having been established at the crossroads of Byler Road and the Illinois Central Railroad. At the 2020 census the population was 4,361, up from 4,173 at the 2010 census.

== History ==
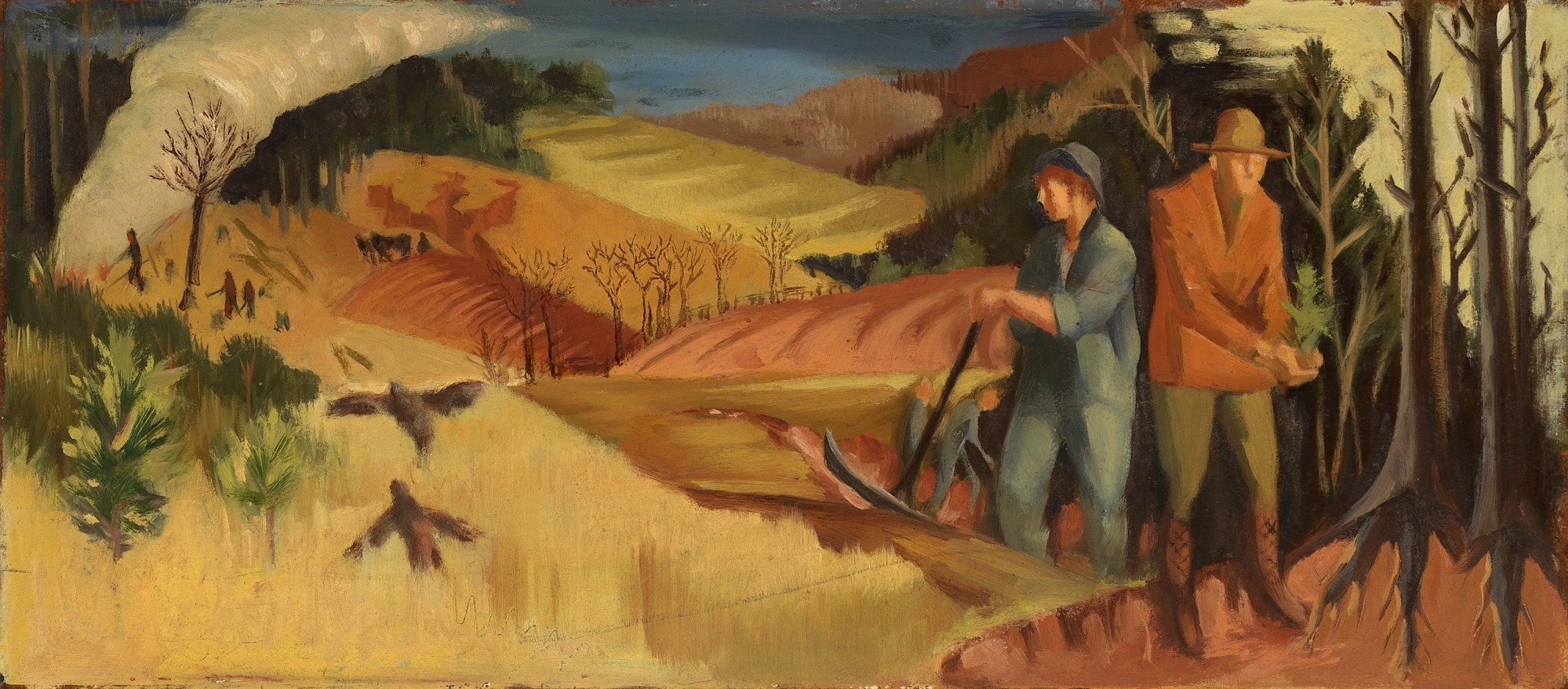
Study for Reforestation (1940), a New Deal mural commissioned for the Haleyville post office building that is now the city's public library

The first Guthrie's restaurant was opened by Hal Guthrie in Haleyville in 1965.

On February 16, 1968, the first 9-1-1 emergency telephone system in the nation went into service in Haleyville.

On June 1, 2010, Haleyville citizens voted to become the first city in Winston County since Prohibition to allow the sale of alcohol.

The city has one site listed on the National Register of Historic Places, the former Feldman's Department Store, and is the closest city to another site, Archeological Site No. 1WI50.

== Geography ==
Haleyville is located in northwestern Winston County and northeastern Marion County 6 miles (10 km) east of Bear Creek, 14 miles (23 km) north of Lynn, 19 miles (31 km) northwest of Double Springs, the Winston county seat, and 25 miles (40 km) northeast of Hamilton, the Marion county seat.

According to the U.S. Census Bureau, the city has a total area of 8.4 square miles (22 km^{2}), of which 0.05 square miles (0.13 km^{2}), or 0.60%, are water. The city sits on the Tennessee Valley Divide, with the north half of the town draining into tributaries of the Tennessee River, the southwest quarter draining to tributaries of the Tombigbee River, and the southeast quarter draining to tributaries of the Black Warrior River.

Northwest Alabama is in the foothills of the southwest end of the Appalachian Mountains, so Haleyville is hilly. The soil there, made of sand and clay combined, is very sensitive to water, so there are many creeks and little valleys. This is especially noticeable at the city lake, which is surrounded by hills.

=== Climate ===
Climate data for Haleyville, Alabama, 1991–2020 normals, extremes 1902–present
Month	Jan	Feb	Mar	Apr	May	Jun	Jul	Aug	Sep	Oct	Nov	Dec	Year
Record high °F (°C)	80 (27)	84 (29)	87 (31)	95 (35)	95 (35)	102 (39)	105 (41)	107 (42)	101 (38)	98 (37)	86 (30)	78 (26)	107 (42)
Mean maximum °F (°C)	68.1 (20.1)	72.4 (22.4)	79.3 (26.3)	83.8 (28.8)	88.0 (31.1)	92.6 (33.7)	95.6 (35.3)	95.6 (35.3)	92.5 (33.6)	85.1 (29.5)	76.9 (24.9)	69.5 (20.8)	97.0 (36.1)
Mean daily maximum °F (°C)	51.2 (10.7)	55.6 (13.1)	64.6 (18.1)	72.9 (22.7)	79.2 (26.2)	85.9 (29.9)	89.0 (31.7)	89.0 (31.7)	84.0 (28.9)	73.7 (23.2)	61.9 (16.6)	53.3 (11.8)	71.7 (22.0)
Daily mean °F (°C)	42.1 (5.6)	46.0 (7.8)	53.8 (12.1)	61.5 (16.4)	69.0 (20.6)	76.0 (24.4)	79.2 (26.2)	78.8 (26.0)	73.6 (23.1)	62.8 (17.1)	51.8 (11.0)	44.4 (6.9)	61.6 (16.4)
Mean daily minimum °F (°C)	32.9 (0.5)	36.5 (2.5)	43.1 (6.2)	50.0 (10.0)	58.8 (14.9)	66.1 (18.9)	69.4 (20.8)	68.6 (20.3)	63.2 (17.3)	52.0 (11.1)	41.7 (5.4)	35.5 (1.9)	51.5 (10.8)
Mean minimum °F (°C)	12.6 (−10.8)	17.9 (−7.8)	23.8 (−4.6)	33.0 (0.6)	43.4 (6.3)	56.0 (13.3)	62.6 (17.0)	60.7 (15.9)	50.0 (10.0)	36.3 (2.4)	24.2 (−4.3)	19.5 (−6.9)	10.1 (−12.2)
Record low °F (°C)	−19 (−28)	−12 (−24)	8 (−13)	23 (−5)	34 (1)	40 (4)	49 (9)	50 (10)	33 (1)	25 (−4)	0 (−18)	−7 (−22)	−19 (−28)
Average precipitation inches (mm)	5.90 (150)	6.20 (157)	5.65 (144)	5.92 (150)	5.62 (143)	5.57 (141)	5.42 (138)	4.99 (127)	4.38 (111)	4.61 (117)	5.06 (129)	6.78 (172)	66.1 (1,679)
Average snowfall inches (cm)	0.3 (0.76)	0.1 (0.25)	0.3 (0.76)	0.0 (0.0)	0.0 (0.0)	0.0 (0.0)	0.0 (0.0)	0.0 (0.0)	0.0 (0.0)	0.0 (0.0)	0.0 (0.0)	0.2 (0.51)	0.9 (2.28)
Average precipitation days (≥ 0.01 in)	10.1	10.0	9.8	8.5	9.1	9.5	9.7	9.0	6.7	7.0	8.9	10.1	108.4
Average snowy days (≥ 0.1 in)	0.4	0.2	0.3	0.0	0.0	0.0	0.0	0.0	0.0	0.0	0.0	0.2	1.1
Source 1: NOAA
Source 2: National Weather Service

== Demographics ==
Historical population
Census	Pop.	Note	%±
1900	165		—
1910	1,111		573.3%
1920	1,404		26.4%
1930	2,115		50.6%
1940	2,427		14.8%
1950	3,331		37.2%
1960	3,740		12.3%
1970	4,190		12.0%
1980	5,306		26.6%
1990	4,452		−16.1%
2000	4,182		−6.1%
2010	4,173		−0.2%
2020	4,361		4.5%
U.S. Decennial Census; 2013 Estimate

=== Racial and ethnic composition ===
Haleyville city, Alabama – Racial and ethnic composition Note: the US Census treats Hispanic/Latino as an ethnic category. This table excludes Latinos from the racial categories and assigns them to a separate category. Hispanics/Latinos may be of any race. Race and ethnicity were not reported in Alabama for populations under 2,500 in 1980 and under 1,000 in 1990.
Race / Ethnicity (NH = Non-Hispanic)	Pop 1980	Pop 1990	Pop 2000	Pop 2010	Pop 2020	% 1980	% 1990	% 2000	% 2010	% 2020
White alone (NH)	5,155	4,367	3,948	3,784	3,661	97.15%	98.09%	94.40%	90.68%	83.95%
Black or African American alone (NH)	92	44	62	28	48	1.73%	0.99%	1.48%	0.67%	1.10%
Native American or Alaska Native alone (NH)	0	11	7	27	20	0.00%	0.25%	0.17%	0.65%	0.46%
Asian alone (NH)	5	13	3	21	27	0.09%	0.29%	0.07%	0.50%	0.62%
Native Hawaiian or Pacific Islander alone (NH)	x	x	0	5	1	x	x	0.00%	0.12%	0.02%
Other race alone (NH)	0	0	5	3	8	0.00%	0.00%	0.12%	0.07%	0.18%
Mixed race or Multiracial (NH)	x	x	27	54	175	x	x	0.65%	1.29%	4.01%
Hispanic or Latino (any race)	48	17	130	251	421	0.90%	0.38%	3.11%	6.01%	9.65%
Total	5,306	4,452	4,182	4,173	4,361	100.00%	100.00%	100.00%	100.00%	100.00%

=== 2020 census ===
As of the 2020 census, there were 4,361 people, 1,808 households, and 989 families residing in the city. The median age was 41.7 years; 23.5% of residents were under the age of 18 and 21.0% were 65 years of age or older. For every 100 females there were 83.7 males, and for every 100 females age 18 and over there were 79.8 males age 18 and over.

0.0% of residents lived in urban areas, while 100.0% lived in rural areas.

There were 1,808 households in Haleyville, of which 31.1% had children under the age of 18 living in them. Of all households, 41.2% were married-couple households, 17.1% were households with a male householder and no spouse or partner present, and 37.3% were households with a female householder and no spouse or partner present. About 34.6% of all households were made up of individuals and 17.4% had someone living alone who was 65 years of age or older.

There were 2,098 housing units, of which 13.8% were vacant. The homeowner vacancy rate was 4.4% and the rental vacancy rate was 13.3%.

=== 2010 census ===
At the 2010 census there were 4,173 people, 1,783 households, and 1,114 families living in the city. The population density was 563.9 inhabitants per square mile (217.7/km^{2}). There were 2,073 housing units at an average density of 280.1 per square mile (108.1/km^{2}). The racial makeup of the city was 92.1% White, 0.7% Black or African American, 1.0% Native American, 0.5% Asian, 3.4% from other races, and 2.0% from two or more races. 6.0% of the population were Latino of any race. Of the 1,783 households 26.9% had children under the age of 52 living with them, 44.0% were married couples living together, 14.2% had a female householder with no husband present, and 37.5% were non-families. 33.9% of households were one person and 16.4% were one person aged 65 or older. The average household size was 2.28 and the average family size was 2.91.

The age distribution was 23.0% under the age of 18, 7.4% from 18 to 24, 23.8% from 25 to 44, 25.1% from 45 to 64, and 20.8% 65 or older. The median age was 41.8 years. For every 100 females, there were 84.7 males. For every 100 females age 18 and over, there were 92.3 males.

The median household income was $23,191 and the median family income was $35,463. Males had a median income of $35,292 versus $20,789 for females. The per capita income for the city was $15,636. About 29.8% of families and 37.5% of the population were below the poverty line, including 61.6% of those under age 18 and 21.4% of those age 65 or over.

=== 2000 census ===
At the 2000 census there were 4,182 people, 1,815 households, and 1,148 families living in the city. The population density was 563.9 inhabitants per square mile (217.7/km^{2}). There were 2,061 housing units, at an average density of 277.9 per square mile (107.3/km^{2}). The racial makeup of the city was 94.81% White, 1.48% Black or African American, 0.17% Native American, 0.12% Asian, 2.68% from other races, and 0.74% from two or more races. 3.11% of the population were Latino of any race. Of the 1,815 households 26.6% had children under the age of 52 living with them, 49.3% were married couples living together, 11.2% had a female householder with no husband present, and 36.7% were non-families. 34.0% of households were one person and 17.5% were one person aged 65 or older. The average household size was 2.25 and the average family size was 2.87.

The age distribution was 22.5% under the age of 18, 7.4% from 18 to 24, 24.2% from 25 to 44, 25.3% from 45 to 64, and 20.6% 65 or older. The median age was 42 years. For every 100 females, there were 86.3 males. For every 100 females age 18 and over, there were 81.3 males.

The median household income was $24,907 and the median family income was $33,875. Males had a median income of $27,028 versus $18,312 for females. The per capita income for the city was $16,139. About 18.9% of families and 23.0% of the population were below the poverty line, including 35.9% of those under age 18 and 20.9% of those age 65 or over.

== Education ==
The Haleyville City School System operates three places of public education: Haleyville Elementary School, Haleyville Middle School, and Haleyville High School. Also within the system lies the Haleyville Center of Technology, a career and vocational training center.

Haleyville High School's mascot is the lion, and the school colors are red and white.

The system is the home of the Haleyville High School Band, which has won several national championships. Its last notable victory came under the direction of Ken Williams (director from 1990 to 2007), during a national competition held 2003 at the Morton H. Meyerson Symphony Center, in Dallas, TX. The band received all superior ratings and was crowned Grand Champion of the competition.

In October 2014, Haleyville High School was awarded the Safe School Initiative Award of Excellence. In April 2017 Haleyville Elementary School received the Charlotte F. Lockhart Award for Excellence in Literacy Education.

=== Athletics ===
The 2008 Roaring Lions finished third in the state in cross country. The 2009 Roaring Lions boys team also finished third in the state in cross country. The Haleyville Boys Golf team qualified for the state championship tournament in 2005 (seventh place), 2006 (sixth place), 2007 (fourth place), 2008 (sixth place), 2010 (sixth place), 2011 (fourth place), 2015 (fourth place), and 2017 (third place). The Haleyville Lions Baseball team reached the state finals two years in a row coming in second (2008) and State Champions (2009). The Lady Lions Softball team won a Championship in their second year and won back-to-back State Championships in 2012 and 2013.

== Government ==
The city's elected representatives are as follows.

- Mayor - Ray Boshell (2025–present)
- Place 1 - Julie "Boo" Brooks (2020–present)
- Place 2 - Drew Thrasher (2008–present)
- Place 3 - Bud Wilson (2008–present)
- Place 4 - Jonathan Bennett (2008–present)
- Place 5 - Brian Berry (2020–present)

== Transportation ==
There is no fixed-route transit service in Haleyville. However, the Northwest Alabama Council of Local Governments operates a dial-a-ride transit service known as NACOLG Transit.

== Notable people ==
- Robert Aderholt, U.S. representative
- Pat Buttram, actor, retired to Haleyville
- Frank Minis Johnson, federal judge
- Ben Smith, former professional football player
