= Curry, Walker County, Alabama =

Curry, Alabama
- Unincorporated community
- Location within Alabama Location within the United States
- Coordinates: 33°57′13″N 87°12′52″W
- Country: United States
- State: Alabama
- County: Walker
- Elevation: 623 ft (190 m)
- Time zone: UTC-6 (Central (CST))
  - Summer (DST): UTC-5 (CDT)
- Area codes: 205, 659
- GNIS feature ID: 159474

Curry is an unincorporated community in north-central Walker County Alabama, United States. It is the closest community to the Lewis Smith Lake dam. Curry is served by Alabama State Route 257, which is simply known as Curry Highway by locals.

== Education ==
Curry has three primary schools. Curry Elementary, Curry Middle, and Curry High. Curry High School is a 5A school, serving grades 9–12. The school colors are Blue and Gold with the mascot being the Yellow Jacket. It is a member of the Walker County Board of Education.

== Notable person ==
- Charles Martin, Alabama politician
