= Houston, Alabama =

Unincorporated community in Alabama, United States

- Unincorporated community
- Location within the state of Alabama Houston, Alabama (the United States)
- Coordinates: 34.14149°N 87.25806°W
- Country: United States
- State: Alabama
- County: Winston
- Elevation: 761 ft (232 m)
- Time zone: UTC-6 (Central (CST))
  - Summer (DST): UTC-5 (CDT)
- ZIP code: 35572
- Area codes: 256 and 938

Houston is an unincorporated community in Winston County, Alabama, United States. It was the county seat from 1858 until 1884, when the seat was moved to Double Springs. Houston has one site on the National Register of Historic Places, the log Houston Jail.

== Demographics ==
Historical population
Census	Pop.	Note	%±
1880	103		—
U.S. Decennial Census

Houston appeared once on the U.S. Census in 1880, shortly before it lost its status as county seat. It has not appeared on census rolls since.

== Geography ==
Houston is located at 34.14149°N 87.25806°W and has an elevation of 761 feet (232 m).
