= Glen Mary, Alabama =

Unincorporated community in Alabama, United States

- Unincorporated community
- Location of Glen Mary in Alabama
- Coordinates: 34°07′27″N 87°37′25″W
- Country: United States
- State: Alabama
- County: Winston
- Founded: 1908
- Elevation: 722 ft (220 m)
- Time zone: UTC-6 (Central (CST))
  - Summer (DST): UTC-5 (CDT)
- Area codes: 205, 659
- GNIS feature ID: 159670
- Other name: Glenmary

Glen Mary is an unincorporated community in Winston County, Alabama, United States.

== Geography ==
Glen Mary is located at 34°07′27″N 87°37′25″W (34.124268, -87.623633). It lies 722 feet (220 m) above sea level.
