= William B. Bankhead National Forest =

Protected area in the U.S. state of Alabama

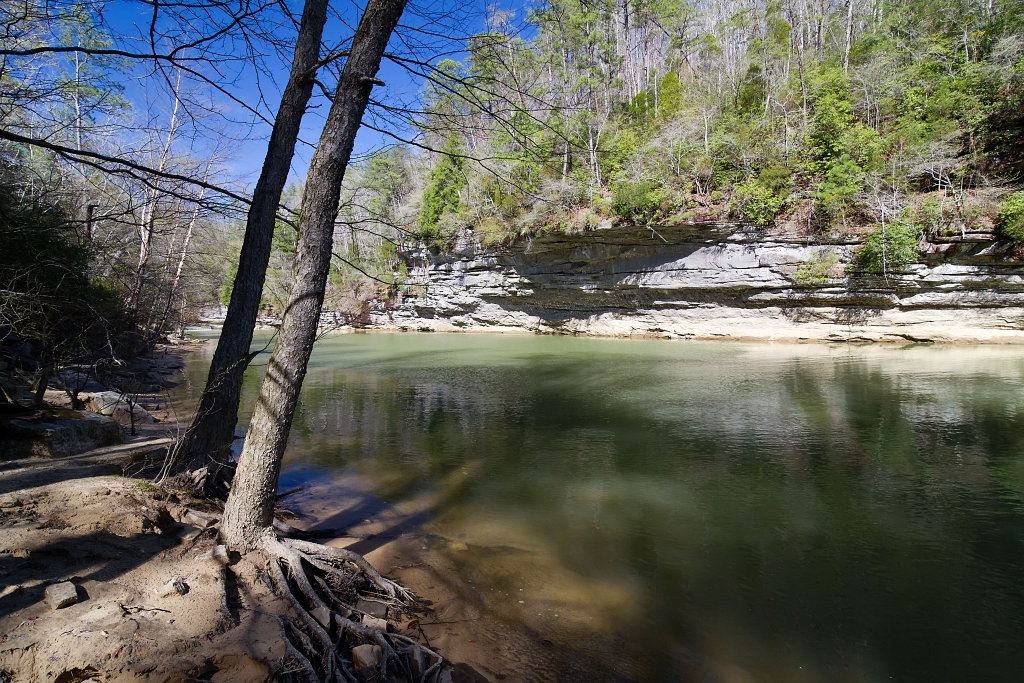
- Clear Creek

- Location within the United States
- Location: Lawrence / Winston / Franklin counties, Alabama, United States
- Nearest city: Moulton, AL
- Coordinates: 34°14′14″N 87°20′4″W
- Area: 181,230 acres (733.4 km^{2})
- Established: January 15, 1918
- Named for: William B. Bankhead
- Governing body: U.S. Forest Service
- Website: Bankhead National Forest

The William B. Bankhead National Forest is one of Alabama's four National Forests, covering 181,230 acres (733 km^{2}). It is home to Alabama's only National Wild and Scenic River, the Sipsey Fork. It is located in northwestern Alabama, around the town of Double Springs. It is named in honor of William B. Bankhead, a longtime U.S. representative from Alabama.

Known as the "land of a thousand waterfalls", this National Forest is popular for hiking, horseback riding, hunting, boating, fishing, swimming, canoeing and more. Within the forest lies the Sipsey Wilderness, with a host of wildlife and an abundance of swift streams, limestone bluffs, and waterfalls. The forest also surrounds the western portion of Lewis Smith Lake. Native American relics abound in Bankhead, one of the Southern United States's premier sites for petroglyphs, prehistoric drawings, and rock carvings, at sites such as the Kinlock Shelter.

The forest is headquartered in Montgomery, as are all four of Alabama's National Forests. The other National Forests in the state are Conecuh, Talladega, and Tuskegee. There are local ranger district offices located in Double Springs.

The forest was established as Alabama National Forest on January 15, 1918, with 66,008 acres (267.12 km^{2}). On June 19, 1936, it was renamed Black Warrior National Forest, which in turn was renamed William B. Bankhead National Forest on June 6, 1942. In 1959, Executive Order 10850 removed land from the forest's boundaries.

== See also ==
- List of national forests of the United States
