= Walker County Airport =

Aerodrome in Alabama, USA

Walker County Airport Bevill Field
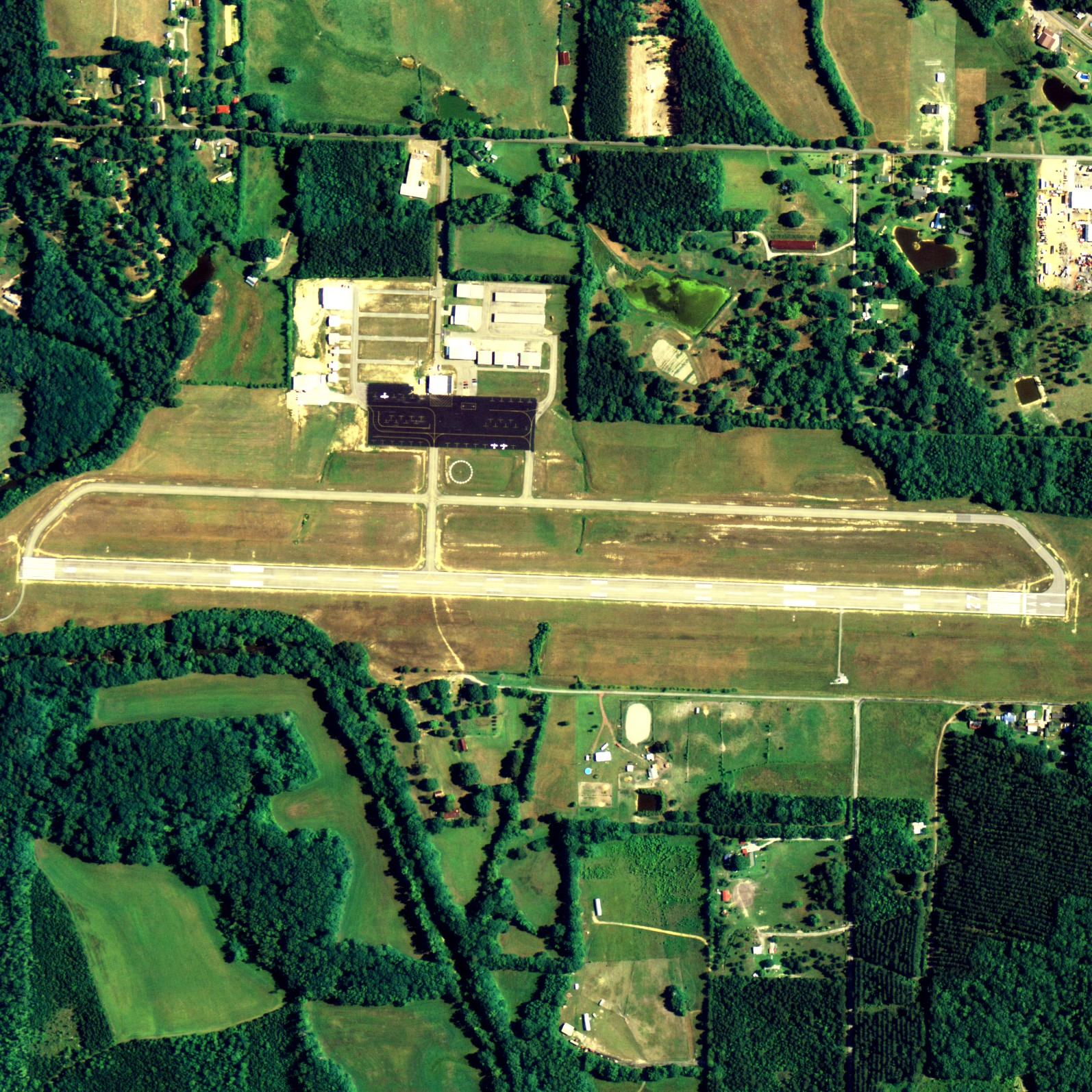
- NAIP aerial image, 2006
- IATA: none; ICAO: KJFX; FAA LID: JFX

Summary
- Airport type: Public
- Owner: Walker County Commission
- Serves: Jasper, Alabama
- Elevation AMSL: 482 ft / 147 m
- Coordinates: 33°54′07″N 087°18′51″W
- Interactive map of Walker County Airport

Runways
Direction	Length		Surface
Direction	ft	m	Surface
9/27	5,003	1,525	Asphalt

Statistics (2000)
- Aircraft operations: 33,616
- Based aircraft: 55
- Source: Federal Aviation Administration

Walker County Airport (ICAO: KJFX, FAA LID: JFX, formerly L02), also known as Bevill Field, is a public airport located five miles (8 km) northwest of the central business district of Jasper, a city in Walker County, Alabama, United States. It is owned by the Walker County Commission.

Although most U.S. airports use the same three-letter location identifier for the FAA and IATA, Walker County Airport is assigned JFX by the FAA but has no designation from the IATA.

== Facilities and aircraft ==
Walker County Airport covers an area of 297 acres (120 ha) which contains one runway (9/27) with a 5,003 x 100 ft (1,525 x 30 m) asphalt pavement. For the 12-month period ending April 5, 2000, the airport had 33,616 aircraft operations, an average of 92 per day: 99.7% general aviation and 0.3% military. At that time there were 55 aircraft based at this airport: 87% single-engine, 9% multi-engine and 4% jet.

== Air Resorts Airline Flight 953 accident ==
On December 16, 1984, Air Resorts Airlines Flight 953 experienced an in-flight engine failure, fire, and ground collision during the landing roll following an emergency landing at the airport. The flight was carrying the East Tennessee State University basketball team to Oxford, Mississippi from Birmingham, Alabama. Two of the 39 occupants of the Convair CV 440 airplane were seriously injured during the accident, 11 others received minor injuries. As the airport did not have on-field emergency services, the nearby Jasper Fire Department was called by the airport manager moments before the emergency landing after being alerted by the Birmingham Approach air traffic controller. During the landing the aircraft veered off Runway 27 and crossed the north–south taxiway, at which time the right landing gear separated and the airplane skidded to a stop. The aircraft was subsequently destroyed by fire. The NTSB concluded the accident resulted from the failure of the Number 6 cylinder in the right engine which caused a complete loss of power with a subsequent windmilling propeller and engine fire.

== See also ==
- List of airports in Alabama
