= Double Springs, Alabama =

Town in and county seat of Winston County, Alabama

- Town
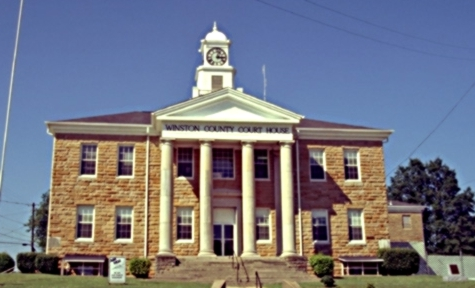
- Winston County courthouse in Double Springs

- Location of Double Springs in Winston County, Alabama.
- Coordinates: 34°08′50″N 87°21′20″W
- Country: United States
- State: Alabama
- County: Winston

Area
  - Total: 5.14 sq mi (13.31 km^{2})
  - Land: 5.12 sq mi (13.25 km^{2})
  - Water: 0.023 sq mi (0.06 km^{2})
- Elevation: 745 ft (227 m)

Population (2020)
  - Total: 1,119
  - Density: 218.6/sq mi (84.42/km^{2})
- Time zone: UTC-6 (Central (CST))
  - Summer (DST): UTC-5 (CDT)
- ZIP code: 35553
- Area codes: 205, 659
- FIPS code: 01-21280
- GNIS feature ID: 2406389
- Website: Town of Double Springs

Double Springs is a town in Winston County, Alabama, United States. The city is the county seat of Winston County. The county seat was initially located at Houston, but by referendum in 1883, Double Springs prevailed and it was removed to there. It was incorporated on May 17, 1943. As of the 2020 census, Double Springs had a population of 1,119.

== Geography ==
According to the U.S. Census Bureau, the town has a total area of 3.9 square miles (10 km^{2}), all land.

=== Climate ===
According to the Köppen climate classification, Double Springs has a humid subtropical climate (abbreviated Cfa).

Climate data for Double Springs, 1991–2020 simulated normals (761 ft elevation)
Month	Jan	Feb	Mar	Apr	May	Jun	Jul	Aug	Sep	Oct	Nov	Dec	Year
Mean daily maximum °F (°C)	50.9 (10.5)	55.4 (13.0)	63.9 (17.7)	72.3 (22.4)	79.3 (26.3)	85.8 (29.9)	88.9 (31.6)	88.5 (31.4)	83.8 (28.8)	73.8 (23.2)	62.4 (16.9)	53.8 (12.1)	71.6 (22.0)
Daily mean °F (°C)	40.6 (4.8)	44.1 (6.7)	52.0 (11.1)	59.9 (15.5)	68.2 (20.1)	75.4 (24.1)	78.6 (25.9)	78.1 (25.6)	72.5 (22.5)	61.3 (16.3)	50.5 (10.3)	43.7 (6.5)	60.4 (15.8)
Mean daily minimum °F (°C)	30.2 (−1.0)	32.9 (0.5)	40.1 (4.5)	47.7 (8.7)	57.0 (13.9)	64.8 (18.2)	68.5 (20.3)	67.5 (19.7)	61.2 (16.2)	49.1 (9.5)	38.7 (3.7)	33.4 (0.8)	49.3 (9.6)
Average precipitation inches (mm)	5.77 (146.58)	5.85 (148.59)	5.73 (145.64)	5.84 (148.35)	5.12 (130.10)	5.22 (132.58)	5.26 (133.49)	4.37 (110.96)	4.08 (103.64)	4.07 (103.28)	4.62 (117.44)	6.39 (162.24)	62.32 (1,582.89)
Average dew point °F (°C)	32.4 (0.2)	34.5 (1.4)	40.6 (4.8)	48.4 (9.1)	58.6 (14.8)	66.0 (18.9)	69.8 (21.0)	68.5 (20.3)	62.8 (17.1)	52.2 (11.2)	41.5 (5.3)	36.1 (2.3)	51.0 (10.5)
Source: PRISM Climate Group

== Demographics ==
Historical population
Census	Pop.	Note	%±
1950	524		—
1960	811		54.8%
1970	957		18.0%
1980	1,057		10.4%
1990	1,138		7.7%
2000	1,003		−11.9%
2010	1,083		8.0%
2020	1,119		3.3%
U.S. Decennial Census; 2013 Estimate

=== Racial and ethnic composition ===
Double Springs town, Alabama – Racial and ethnic composition Note: the US Census treats Hispanic/Latino as an ethnic category. This table excludes Latinos from the racial categories and assigns them to a separate category. Hispanics/Latinos may be of any race. Race and ethnicity was not surveyed for populations under 2,500 in the 1980 census and under 1,000 in 1990 census.
Race / Ethnicity (NH = Non-Hispanic)	Pop 1990	Pop 2000	Pop 2010	Pop 2020	% 1990	% 2000	% 2010	% 2020
White alone (NH)	1,129	973	1,051	1,049	99.21%	97.01%	97.05%	93.74%
Black or African American alone (NH)	2	3	7	1	0.18%	0.30%	0.65%	0.09%
Native American or Alaska Native alone (NH)	2	6	9	4	0.18%	0.60%	0.83%	0.36%
Asian alone (NH)	0	0	2	0	0.00%	0.00%	0.18%	0.00%
Native Hawaiian or Pacific Islander alone (NH)	x	0	0	1	x	0.00%	0.00%	0.09%
Other race alone (NH)	0	0	0	3	0.00%	0.00%	0.00%	0.27%
Mixed race or Multiracial (NH)	x	10	10	43	x	1.00%	0.92%	3.84%
Hispanic or Latino (any race)	5	11	4	18	0.44%	1.10%	0.37%	1.61%
Total	1,138	1,003	1,083	1,119	100.00%	100.00%	100.00%	100.00%

=== 2020 census ===
As of the 2020 census, Double Springs had a population of 1,119. The median age was 46.0 years. 18.3% of residents were under the age of 18 and 25.3% were 65 years of age or older. For every 100 females there were 97.0 males, and for every 100 females age 18 and over there were 89.2 males age 18 and over.

0.0% of residents lived in urban areas, while 100.0% lived in rural areas.

There were 428 households in Double Springs, of which 32.5% had children under the age of 18 living in them. Of all households, 41.1% were married-couple households, 17.3% were households with a male householder and no spouse or partner present, and 35.7% were households with a female householder and no spouse or partner present. About 34.3% of all households were made up of individuals and 15.2% had someone living alone who was 65 years of age or older.

There were 494 housing units, of which 13.4% were vacant. The homeowner vacancy rate was 0.7% and the rental vacancy rate was 8.8%.

=== 2010 census ===
At the 2010 census there were 1,083 people, 412 households, and 260 families in the town. The population density was 277.7 inhabitants per square mile (107.2/km^{2}). There were 461 housing units at an average density of 118.2 per square mile (45.6/km^{2}). The racial makeup of the town was 97.3% White, 0.6% Black or African American, 0.8% Native American, 0.1% from other races, and 0.9% from two or more races. 0.4% of the population were Hispanic or Latino of any race. Of the 412 households 27.2% had children under the age of 18 living with them, 43.4% were married couples living together, 15.5% had a female householder with no husband present, and 36.9% were non-families. 35.0% of households were one person and 16.5% were one person aged 65 or older. The average household size was 2.21 and the average family size was 2.82.

The age distribution was 20.1% under the age of 18, 7.5% from 18 to 24, 22.2% from 25 to 44, 26.2% from 45 to 64, and 24.0% 65 or older. The median age was 45.2 years. For every 100 females, there were 83.9 males. For every 100 females age 18 and over, there were 89.1 males.

The median household income was $30,865 and the median family income was $32,232. Males had a median income of $27,450 versus $21,641 for females. The per capita income for the town was $13,973. About 21.1% of families and 25.6% of the population were below the poverty line, including 38.7% of those under age 18 and 11.3% of those age 65 or over.

=== 2000 census ===
At the 2000 census there were 1,003 people, 426 households, and 276 families in the town. The population density was 259.5 inhabitants per square mile (100.2/km^{2}). There were 486 housing units at an average density of 125.8 per square mile (48.6/km^{2}). The racial makeup of the town was 97.51% White, 0.30% Black or African American, 0.60% Native American, 0.60% from other races, and 1.00% from two or more races. 1.10% of the population were Hispanic or Latino of any race. Of the 426 households 30.3% had children under the age of 18 living with them, 48.6% were married couples living together, 12.7% had a female householder with no husband present, and 35.0% were non-families. 33.6% of households were one person and 16.9% were one person aged 65 or older. The average household size was 2.18 and the average family size was 2.75.

The age distribution was 21.3% under the age of 18, 8.9% from 18 to 24, 28.3% from 25 to 44, 22.9% from 45 to 64, and 18.5% 65 or older. The median age was 39 years. For every 100 females, there were 93.6 males. For every 100 females age 18 and over, there were 95.8 males.

The median household income was $25,865 and the median family income was $29,615. Males had a median income of $25,667 versus $20,625 for females. The per capita income for the town was $15,122. About 16.8% of families and 20.3% of the population were below the poverty line, including 29.5% of those under age 18 and 28.2% of those age 65 or over.

== Historic and natural attractions ==
Double Springs rests inside the William B. Bankhead National Forest, and is near Lewis Smith Lake. The Kinlock Shelter is located near Double Springs.

In 1944, a memorial marker was erected on the courthouse square "To the memory of the Denson Brothers – Seaborn M. Denson (1854–1936) and Thomas J. Denson (1863–1935) who devoted their lives and gifts to composing and teaching American religious folk music as embodied in the Sacred Harp, in most of the Southern States, but mostly in Alabama. This stone is placed in the midst of their field of labor by the loving hands of their families, pupils of their singing schools, and legions of singers and friends in the summer of the year 1944. The One Hundredth Anniversary of the Sacred Harp while 'Uncle Seab' and 'Uncle Tom' sing on – 'way over in the promised land'."

In 1987, the "Dual Destiny" statue was erected in front of the courthouse. This statue of a soldier, half confederate and half yankee, represents Winston County's dual affiliation during the American Civil War in which soldiers from within the county fought for both the Union and Confederate armies.

Even though Winston County had soldiers on both sides, the county itself refused to secede from the union with the rest of Alabama. This movement became known as the Republic of Winston and remains a local legend to this day.

== Education ==
The main offices of the Winston County School System are located in Double Springs. The chief school in Double Springs is Winston County High School, home of the Yellow Jackets. Winston County High school was the location of the world record for the largest bubble gum bubble, blown by Chad Fell. Winston Career Academy is also located in Double Springs.
