= Mississippi Highway 76 =

State highway in Mississippi, United States

Mississippi Highway 76
- Corridor V
- MS 76 highlighted in red

Route information
- Maintained by MDOT
- Length: 10.7 mi (17.2 km)
- Existed: 2013–present
- History: Completed on April 11, 2023

Major junctions
- West end: MS 25 near Fulton
- MS 23 near Belmont
- East end: SR 24 at the Alabama state line near Red Bay, AL

Location
- Country: United States
- State: Mississippi
- Counties: Itawamba

Highway system
- Mississippi State Highway System; Interstate; US; State
| ← US 72 | → US 78 |

Mississippi Highway 76 (MS 76) is an east-west state highway in Itawamba County, Mississippi. It is a section of Mississippi's portion of Corridor V of the Appalachian Development Highway System. It extends from MS 25 northeast of Fulton to the state line, where it connects with Alabama's SR 24 near Red Bay, Alabama.

MS 76 was proposed as a four-lane connection for SR 24 (and all of northeast Alabama) to Fulton, Tupelo, and I-22. Before 2023, it only extended 2.4 miles (3.9 km) from the state line to MS 23. The remaining 8.3-mile (13.4 km) stretch from MS 23 to MS 25 opened on April 11, 2023, and was the final segment on Corridor V to open, making the trip between I-55 in Batesville to I-24 west of Chattanooga, Tennessee entirely a four-lane divided highway.

== Route description ==
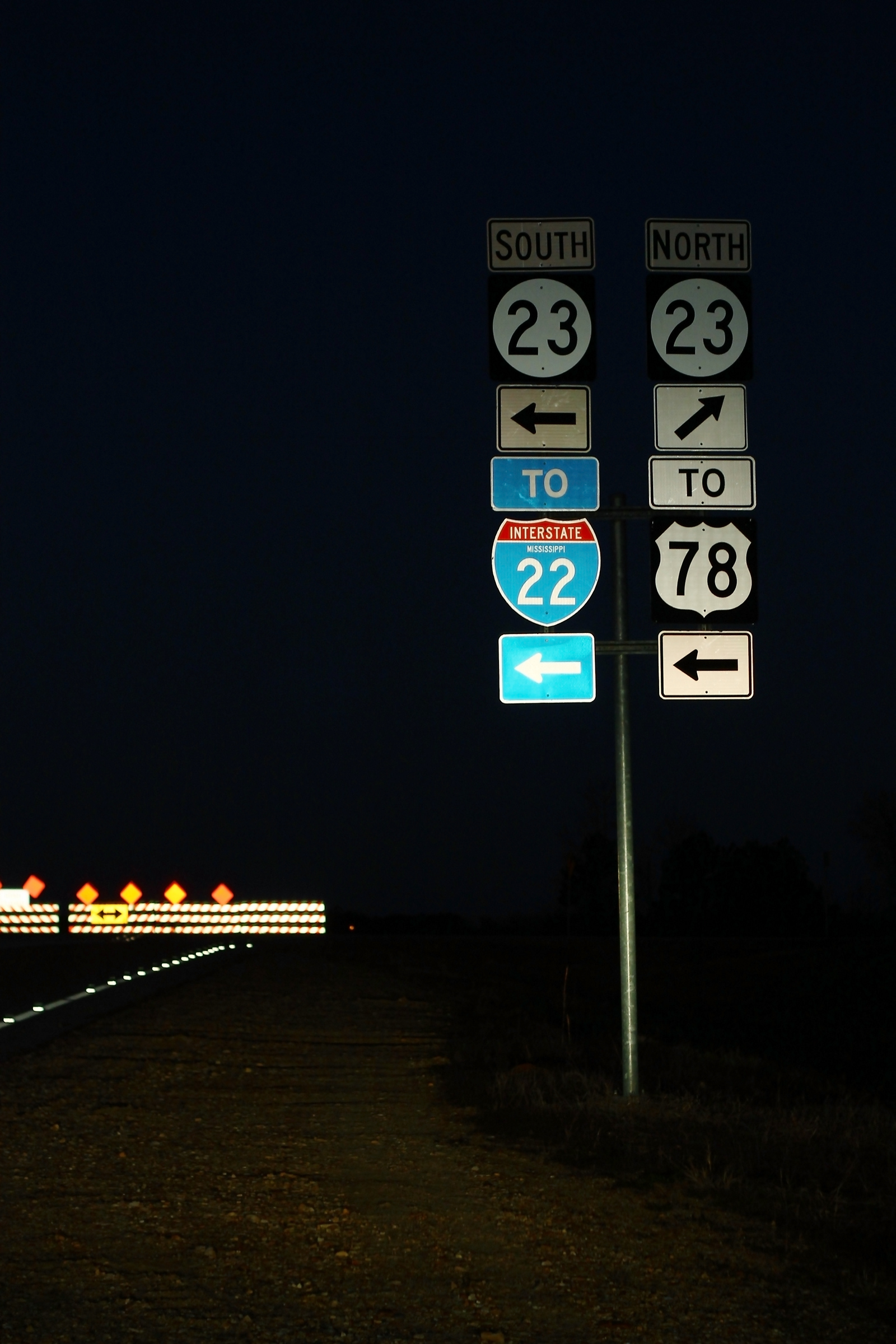
Early morning shot of the former western terminus of MS 76 at MS 23

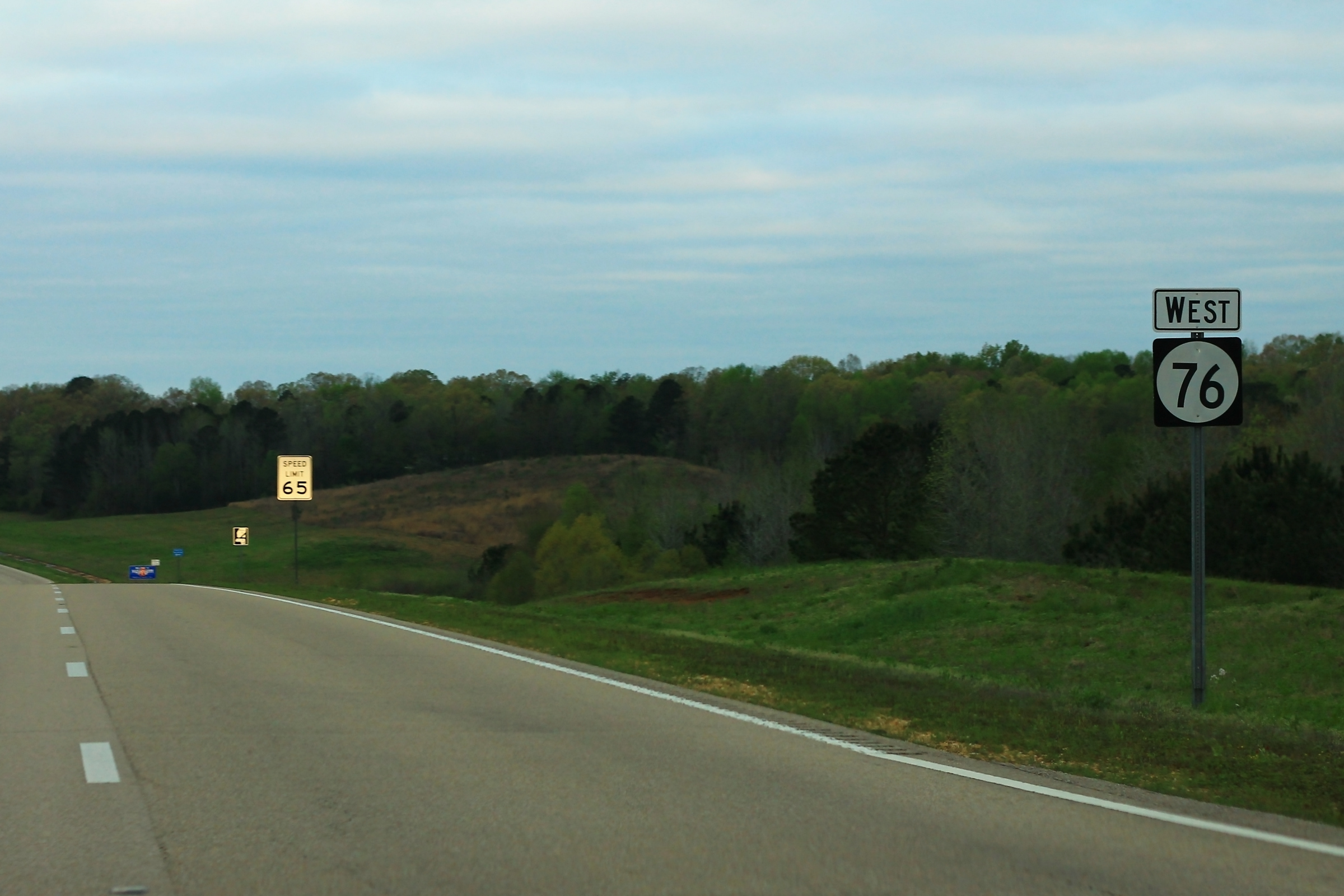
MS 76 westbound at the state line

MS 76 begins at a T-intersection with MS 25 approximately 7 miles (11 km) from that highway's interchange with I-22/US 78 (Exit 108), and 9 miles (14 km) northeast of Fulton, in rural northeastern Itawamba County. It heads east as a four-lane divided highway with a grassy median without outside shoulders and follows an entirely new right-of-way. However, it roughly follows the path of Fairview Banner Road. After heading northeast for 8.3 miles (13.4 km), it then has a T-intersection with MS 23 7 miles (11 km) southeast of Belmont. The highway travels through wooded, hilly terrain, passing by some farms and crossing some small creeks before continuing into Franklin County, Alabama as SR 24.

== History ==
Mississippi Highway 76
- Location: Pontotoc
- Length: 9.1 mi (14.6 km)
- Existed: 1996–2014

The MS 76 designation originated as a temporary designation for the 9.1-mile-long (14.6 km) western portion of the MS 6/US 278 Pontotoc bypass (also known as the Pontotoc Parkway) in Pontotoc, more specifically the section between MS 6/US 278 and the interchange at MS 9. It existed from 1996, until the designation was dropped when the rest of the highway was finished to Tupelo at US 45 in 2014. It, too, was a four-lane divided highway and is also a section of Corridor V. The 5.8-mile-long (9.3 km) section between MS 6/US 278 on the west side of town to MS 15 was the first to open, with a 3.3-mile-long (5.3 km) extension to MS 9 opening in 1998. This MS 76 designation remained unsigned until the year 2000. The current MS 76 was opened in 2013 alongside the opening of SR 24's Red Bay, Alabama bypass.

Construction on the 8.3 miles (13.4 km) segment between MS 23 and MS 25 was originally scheduled to start in 2011 but was delayed due to funding concerns. The project was expected to be completed by the end of 2023, and it ultimately opened to traffic on April 11, 2023.

== Major intersections ==
The entire route is in Itawamba County.

| Location | mi | km | Destinations | Notes |
|---|---|---|---|---|
| | 0.0 | 0.0 | MS 25 to I-22 / US 78 – Fulton, Belmont | Western terminus; segment between here and MS 23 opened to traffic on April 11, 2023, Corridor V follows MS 25 south |
| | 8.3 | 13.4 | MS 23 to I-22 / US 78 – Tremont | Former western terminus until April 11, 2023 |
| | 10.7 | 17.2 | SR 24 east – Red Bay, Russellville | Alabama state line; eastern terminus; Corridor V follows SR 24 east |
1.000 mi = 1.609 km; 1.000 km = 0.621 mi
