= Mississippi Highway 23 =

Highway in Mississippi

Mississippi Highway 23
- MS 23 highlighted in red

Route information
- Maintained by MDOT
- Length: 32.135 mi (51.716 km)
- Existed: c. 1932–1940 c. 1950–present

Major junctions
- South end: MS 25 in Smithville
- I-22 / US 78 in Tremont
- North end: SR 19 at Alabama state line near Red Bay, AL

Location
- Country: United States
- State: Mississippi
- Counties: Monroe, Itawamba

Highway system
- Mississippi State Highway System; Interstate; US; State
← MS 22	→ MS 24

Mississippi Highway 23 (MS 23) is a state highway in Mississippi. The route starts at MS 25 in the town of Smithville. It travels northeastward through the forests of eastern Itawamba County. The highway intersects Interstate 22 (I-22) and U.S. Route 78 (US 78) in Tremont. MS 23 ends at the Mississippi–Alabama state line, just west of Red Bay, continuing as SR 19.

The routing that became part of MS 23 was first constructed as a graded road in 1925, from north of Amory to the state line. Gravel was added to sections of the route in the 1930s. The designation was added to maps around 1950, and it was extended to Smithville in 1960. The route was fully paved by 1980.

== Route description ==
Traffic volume on Mississippi Highway 23
Location	Volume
East of MS 25	3,000
West of Frederick Trail	3,000
North of Jug Shop Road	850
Southwest of Davis Road	560
Northeast of Pierce Road	480
South of Windham Road	620
Southwest of Gann Road	2,200
North of Briar Creek Road	1,500
North of Collier Road	1,500
Southwest of State Line Road	1,900
Data was measured in 2015 in terms of AADT; Source:

The highway is located in northern Monroe and eastern Itawamba counties. MS 23 is legally defined in Mississippi Code § 65-3-3, and is maintained by the Mississippi Department of Transportation as part of the state highway system. The section of the route from Tremont to the Mississippi–Alabama state line is designated as Tammy Wynette Memorial Highway, named after the country music singer–songwriter who grew up near Tremont.

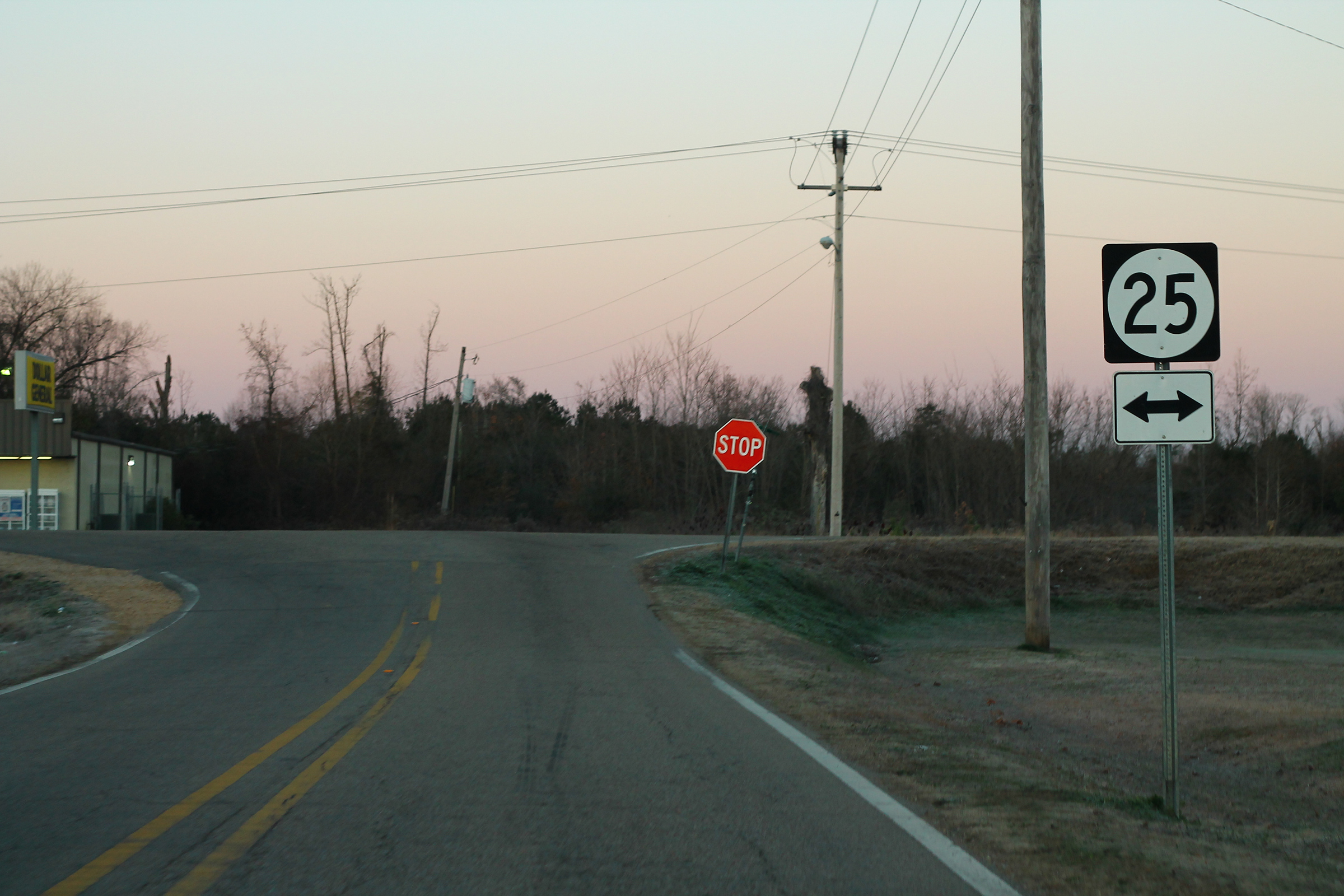
MS 23's southern terminus at MS 25

MS 23 starts at an intersection with MS 25 in the town of Smithville and travels eastward. It leaves the city limits at Seminole Road and crosses Mill Creek shortly after. The road travels through a rural area, and turns northward at George Pearce Road. Past Jug Shop Road, MS 23 crosses the Itawamba County line. Upon entering the county, the route crosses Bluff Creek and travels northeastward. At Bull Mountain Road, the road enters a forest. Traveling past the community of Turon, the road turns further north into the county. Over the next few miles, MS 23 crosses over Smith and Jims creeks and travels toward Cadamy. The road travels north past Cadamy, turning into a divided highway. It meets I-22 and US 78 at a diamond interchange, just within the corporate limits of Tremont. Past the interchange, MS 23 changes back to a two-lane road and intersects MS 178, the beginning of a short concurrency through the town.

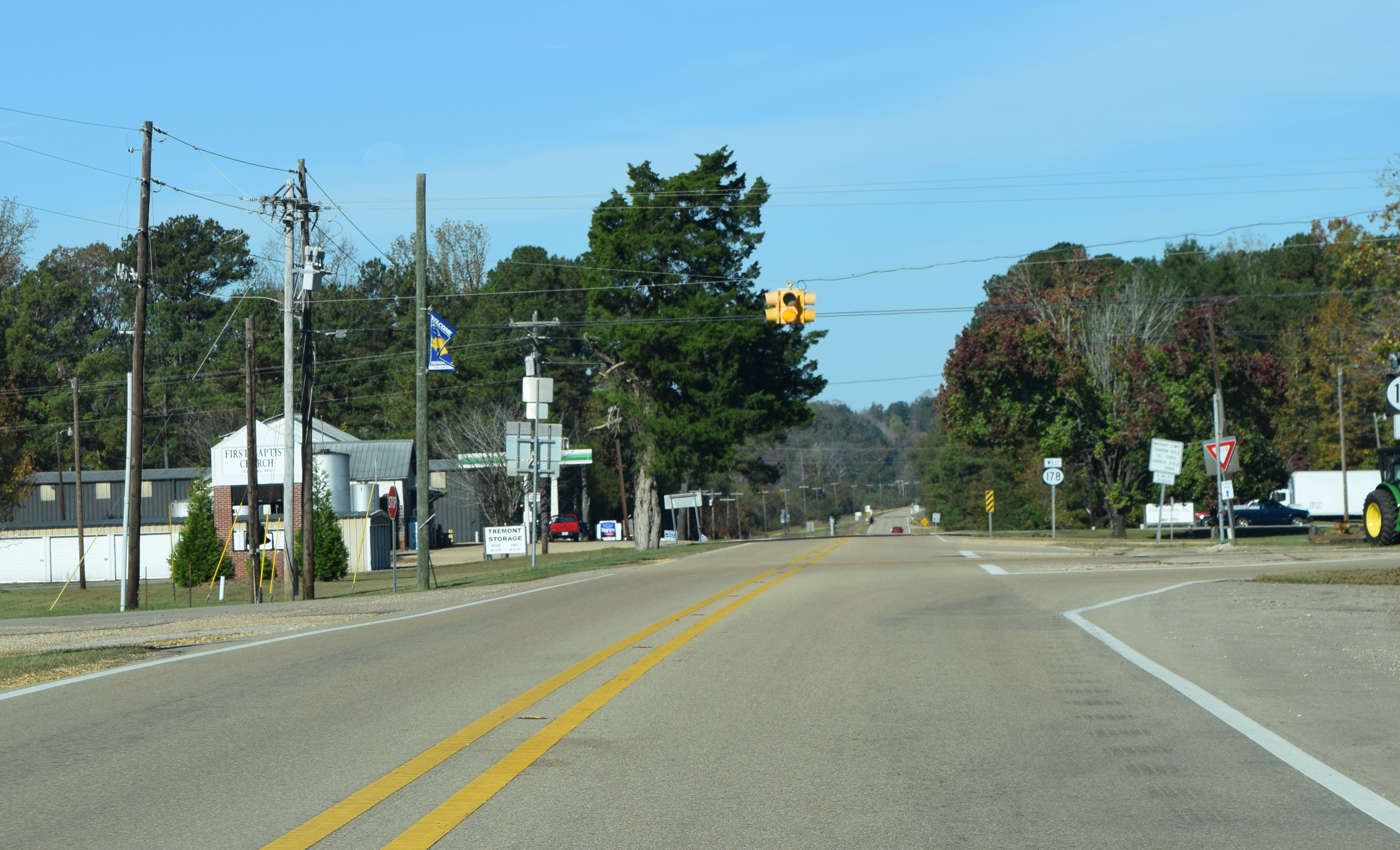
MS 23 and MS 178 in Tremont

Once the concurrency begins, MS 23 and MS 178 travel westward through the center of Tremont. MS 23 departs from MS 178 to the north less than one mile (1.6 km) later, ending the concurrency. It travels northeastward into the forest, and soon leaves the corporate limits. At Cotton Gin Road, MS 23 turns north, crosses Mountain Creek and intersects Mt. Gilead Road and Hartsell Road in the center of Bounds Crossroads. The route intersects MS 76 and later parallels that divided highway. MS 23 shifts slightly north past Pineville Road, and it ends at the Mississippi–Alabama state line. Past this point, Alabama State Route 19 (SR 19), also known as Tammy Wynette Memorial Highway, continues to Red Bay in Franklin County, Alabama.

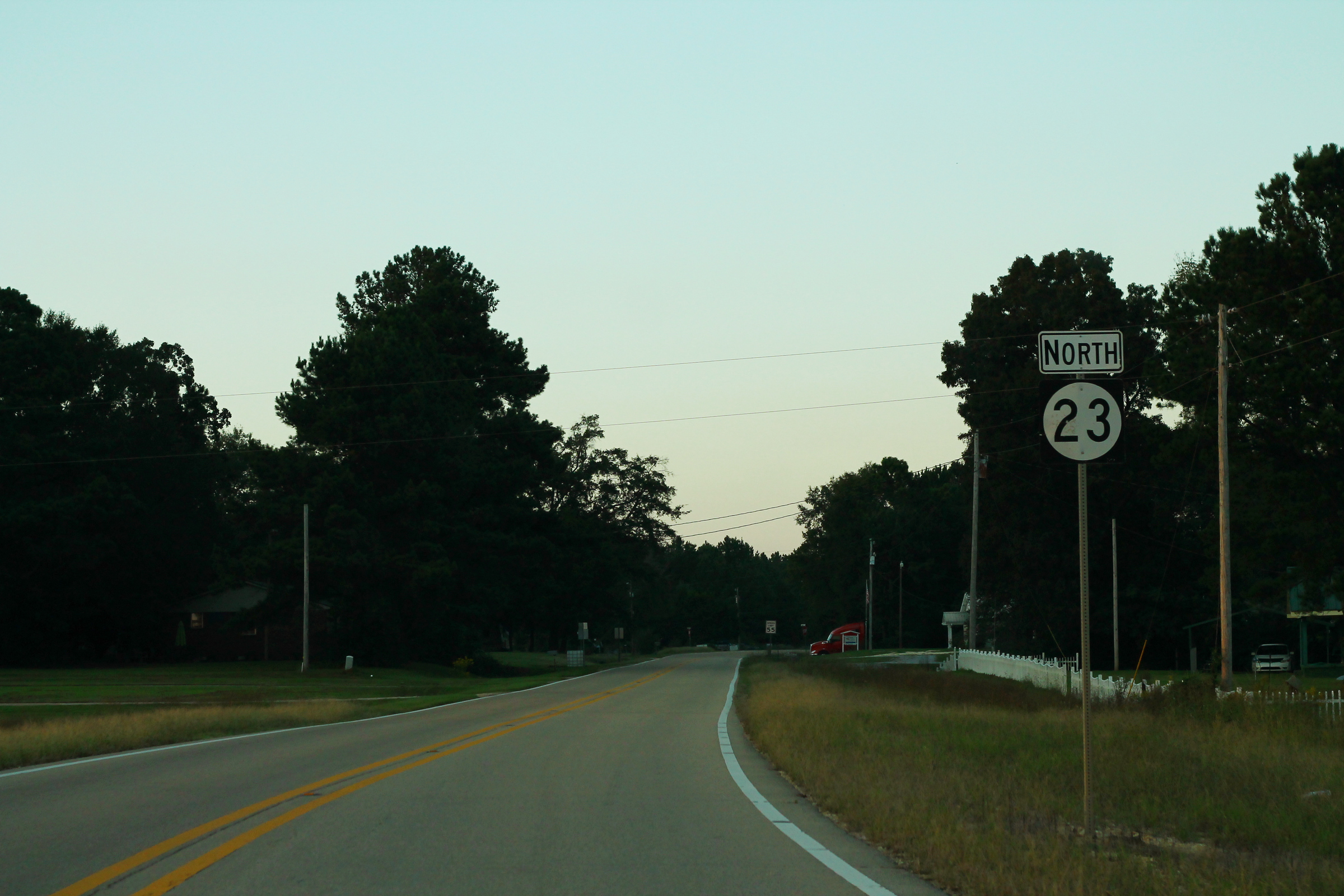
MS 23 northbound near Red Bay, Alabama

== History ==
The MS 23 designation was used for another route from 1932 to 1940. The routing was from Starkville to Shannon when it was first designated. The section from Shannon to Okolona was paved by 1937. The next year, six miles (9.7 km) of the route was paved from West Point southwards. MS 25 was extended south in 1939, replacing all of MS 23 from Starkville to north of West Point. The MS 23 designation was replaced with the MS 45W one by 1940. MS 45W was renumbered in 1968 to US 45 Alternate, its current designation.

The earliest sections of the current routing of MS 23 have existed since 1925, and the road that became MS 23 was part of the state map in 1928 as a graded road. The road traveled from north of Amory to the state line. The section from US 78 northward was paved in gravel by 1933. It was straightened out and extended southwestward three years later. The route designation re-appeared on the state map by 1950. A small section near Tremont was paved five years later, and the majority of the route was paved by 1957. MS 23 was extended to MS 25 and Smithville along a gravel road, and the entire section north of US 78 was paved in 1960. The Monroe County section of the route was paved in 1965, and a part of the route south of Tremont was paved in 1973. The entire route was paved by 1980. In 1991, US 78 was rerouted onto a divided highway, and a new interchange was constructed at MS 23. A part of the Appalachian Development Highway System, Corridor V, was constructed to MS 23 by 2014.

== Major intersections ==
County	Location	mi	km	Destinations	Notes
Monroe	Smithville	0.0	0.0	MS 25 – Amory, Fulton	Southern terminus
Itawamba	Tremont	14.7– 14.9	23.7– 24.0	I-22 / US 78 – Tupelo, Birmingham	I-22 exit 113
Itawamba	Tremont	15.8	25.4	MS 178 east	South end of MS 178 concurrency
Itawamba	Tremont	16.2	26.1	MS 178 west – Fulton	North end of MS 178 concurrency
Itawamba		29.3	47.2	MS 76 To SR 24 – Russellville, Decatur	
Itawamba		32.7	52.6	SR 19 south (Tammy Wynette Memorial Highway) – Red Bay	Alabama state line; northern terminus; former SR 24
1.000 mi = 1.609 km; 1.000 km = 0.621 mi: Concurrency terminus
