= Alabama State Route 19 =

State highway in Alabama, United States

State Route 19

Route information
- Maintained by ALDOT
- Length: 37.6 mi (60.5 km)

Major junctions
- South end: SR 17 near Detroit
- SR 74 to I-22 at Hamilton; SR 24 in Red Bay
- North end: MS 23 at Mississippi state line in Red Bay

Location
- Country: United States
- State: Alabama
- Counties: Lamar, Marion, Franklin

Highway system
- Alabama State Highway System; Interstate; US; State
| ← SR 18 | → I-20 |

State Route 19 (SR 19) is a 37.6-mile-long (60.5 km) state highway in the northwestern part of the U.S. state of Alabama. The southern terminus of the route is at its intersection with SR 17 at Detroit in northern Lamar County. The northern terminus of the route is a continuation of Mississippi Highway 23 (MS 23) at the Mississippi state line in Red Bay, Franklin County.

== Route description ==
State Route 19 travels 37.61 miles through Marion and Franklin Counties in northwestern Alabama. Beginning from SR 17 north of Detroit in Lamar County, SR 19 enters Marion County in 0.18 miles. SR 19 arcs northeast to Byrd and western reaches of Hamilton. Paralleling I-22/U.S. 78 north, SR 19 intersects SR 74 adjacent to Exit 7.

Leaving Hamilton, SR 19 continues 11.97 miles along a rural course from SR 74 into Franklin County. SR 19 proceeds 3.60 miles north to Pilot Hill and the west end of SR 172 by the town of Vina. SR 19 turns west 1.56 miles from SR 172 to CR 23 the town center.

SR 19 heads northwest from Vina into the city of Red Bay. A diamond interchange joins SR 19 with the expressway along SR 24 (Corridor V). Prior to December 2014, SR 19 concluded along 11th Street SE at 4th Avenue S/SE, the former alignment of SR 24 through Red Bay. Upon completion of the Red Bay bypass along SR 24, SR 19 was extended west over what was SR 24 along 4th Avenue S across Downtown Red Bay. SR 19 concludes at the state line, where Mississippi Highway 23 takes over south to Tremont.

The entire length of State Route 19 is a paved two-lane highway.

== Major intersections ==
| County | Location | mi | km | Destinations | Notes |
|---|---|---|---|---|---|
| Lamar | | 0.000 | 0.000 | SR 17 – Hamilton, Detroit, Sulligent | Southern terminus |
| Marion | | 11.511 | 18.525 | SR 74 to CR 94 west / I-22 / US 78 / US 278 east – Tupelo, Hamilton | |
| Franklin | | 27.082 | 43.584 | SR 172 east – Hodges, Hackleburg | |
| Franklin | Red Bay | 35.241 | 56.715 | SR 24 | Interchange |
| Franklin | Red Bay | 35.834 | 57.669 | 4th Avenue - Russellville | Former SR 24 east; SR 19 follows former SR 24 west |
| Franklin | Red Bay | 36.6 | 58.9 | 4th Street SW to MS 366 – Golden, Belmont | |
| Franklin | Red Bay | 37.6 | 60.5 | MS 23 south (Tammy Wynette Memorial Highway) – Tremont | Mississippi state line; northern terminus |
1.000 mi = 1.609 km; 1.000 km = 0.621 mi
