= Bexar, Alabama =

- Unincorporated community
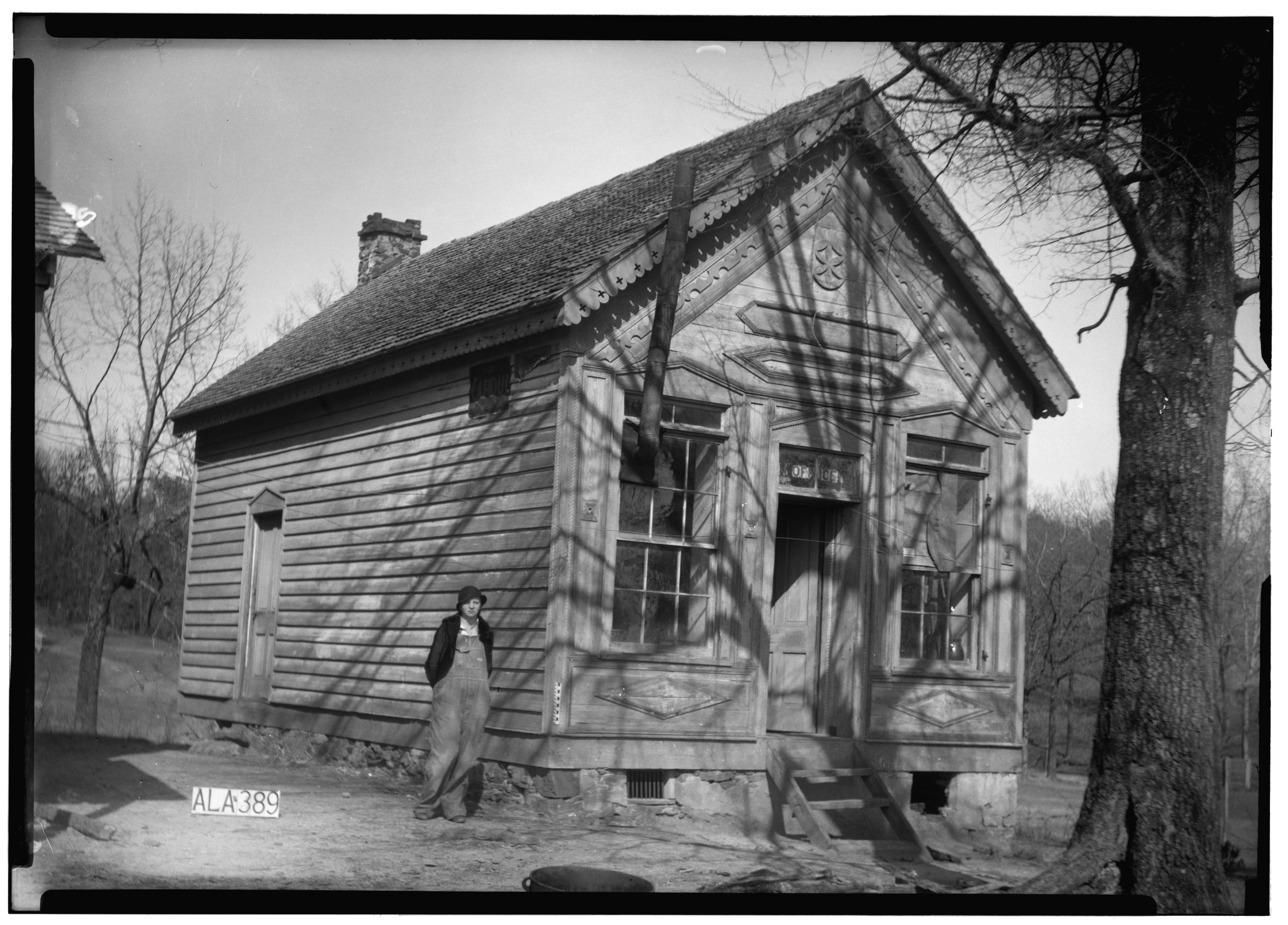
- Bexar Apothecary, taken as part of the Historic American Buildings Survey

- Location within Alabama Location within the United States
- Coordinates: 34°11′27″N 88°08′50″W
- Country: United States
- State: Alabama
- County: Marion
- Elevation: 518 ft (158 m)
- Time zone: UTC-6 (Central (CST))
  - Summer (DST): UTC-5 (CDT)
- Area codes: 205, 659
- GNIS feature ID: 114199

Bexar is a rural, mostly agricultural community in extreme west Marion County, Alabama, United States, approximately three miles from the Alabama - Mississippi state line.

== Origins ==
The community was founded circa 1830 and named for the Mission (then known as San Antonio de Béxar) which was the location of the Battle of the Alamo, scene of one of the bloodiest battles fought on North American soil. Bexar first appeared on the Alabama state map in 1853. The major road through Bexar was U.S. Route 78, connecting Birmingham and Memphis, Tennessee. However, the road was improved and rerouted about one mile north of Bexar in the 1960s. All that remains today in Bexar are homes, a few churches and the vacant buildings that once housed the post office and general store.

== Demographics ==
Historical population
Census	Pop.	Note	%±
1880	37		—
U.S. Decennial Census

Bexar appeared on the 1880 U.S. Census having 37 residents. It was the only time it appeared on census rolls.

== Postal service ==
The Bexar post office was established August 12, 1843, making it the oldest post office in Marion County. Richmon Pearce Goggans served the longest of any postmaster here, from 1905 until 1953. Postal service was discontinued on February 15, 1974. Mrs. Willie Lou Lochridge served as the last Postmaster from May 1971 till the end. The local community rallied around the post office in an attempt to thwart the end of postal service but were not successful. At the time the post office was closed, it had a modern building for the times, having been built in 1962. Former postmaster Pearce Goggans was the guest of honor at the dedication of the new post office, and U.S. Rep. Carl Elliott gave a speech. The Bexar post office served a large area of Western Alabama and Eastern Mississippi. The old Bexar rural delivery area is now served by the post offices in Detroit, Vina, Hamilton (all in Alabama) and Tremont, Mississippi. The ZIP code assigned to the Bexar post office was 35547.

== Schools ==
Bexar has been the home of two secondary schools. Gravel Springs Junior High School (home of the Golden Tigers) was established in 1907 and educated the children of the surrounding countryside until 1985. It was the last "country school" in Marion County. Gravel Springs "graduated" sophomore students to Hamilton High School up until the 1950s. At the time it was closed it only served to 8th grade. There have been three Gravel Springs Junior High School buildings. The last one was dedicated in 1947 and still stands. The school grounds are owned by a local family and serve as a gathering place each Christmas and Decoration Day for the family. After the school was closed, the buyers utilized two of the class rooms on the southern end of the school to manufacture horse trailers for a few years and thus the exterior wall was knocked out. Other than that, the building looks much the way it did when it was closed in 1985, both on the exterior and interior. The other school that served the Bexar community over the years was known as Ada Hannar High School. It was established in 1921 as the Marion County Training School and then the Rosenwald School. The first teachers at the school were Professor G.H. Hannar and his wife, Ada—hence the name of the school. The Marion County Board of Education gave permission for a new school to be built to replace the outdated Rosenwald School building and on September 19, 1965, the Ada Hannar High School was dedicated. However, in 1967, with desegregation, the AHHS began phasing out grades. The students were transferred to Hamilton with the school being shut down completely at the end of the 1969 school year. The building was used as a place for local children to play basketball in the school gym for a few years, then was used as a manufacturing plant. It has since fallen into severe disrepair after a fire gutted most of the school building. The remnants of the school are still standing, though they are very overgrown with weeds and trees.
