= Alabama State Route 247 =

State highway in Alabama, United States

State Route 247

Route information
- Maintained by ALDOT
- Length: 24.849 mi (39.991 km)

Major junctions
- South end: SR 24 east of Red Bay
- North end: US 72 west of Muscle Shoals

Location
- Country: United States
- State: Alabama
- Counties: Franklin, Colbert

Highway system
- Alabama State Highway System; Interstate; US; State
| ← SR 245 | → SR 248 |

State Route 247 (SR 247) is a 25-mile-long (40 km) route that serves as a connection between State Route 24 east of Halltown with U.S. Route 72 (US 72) west of Muscle Shoals.

== Route description ==
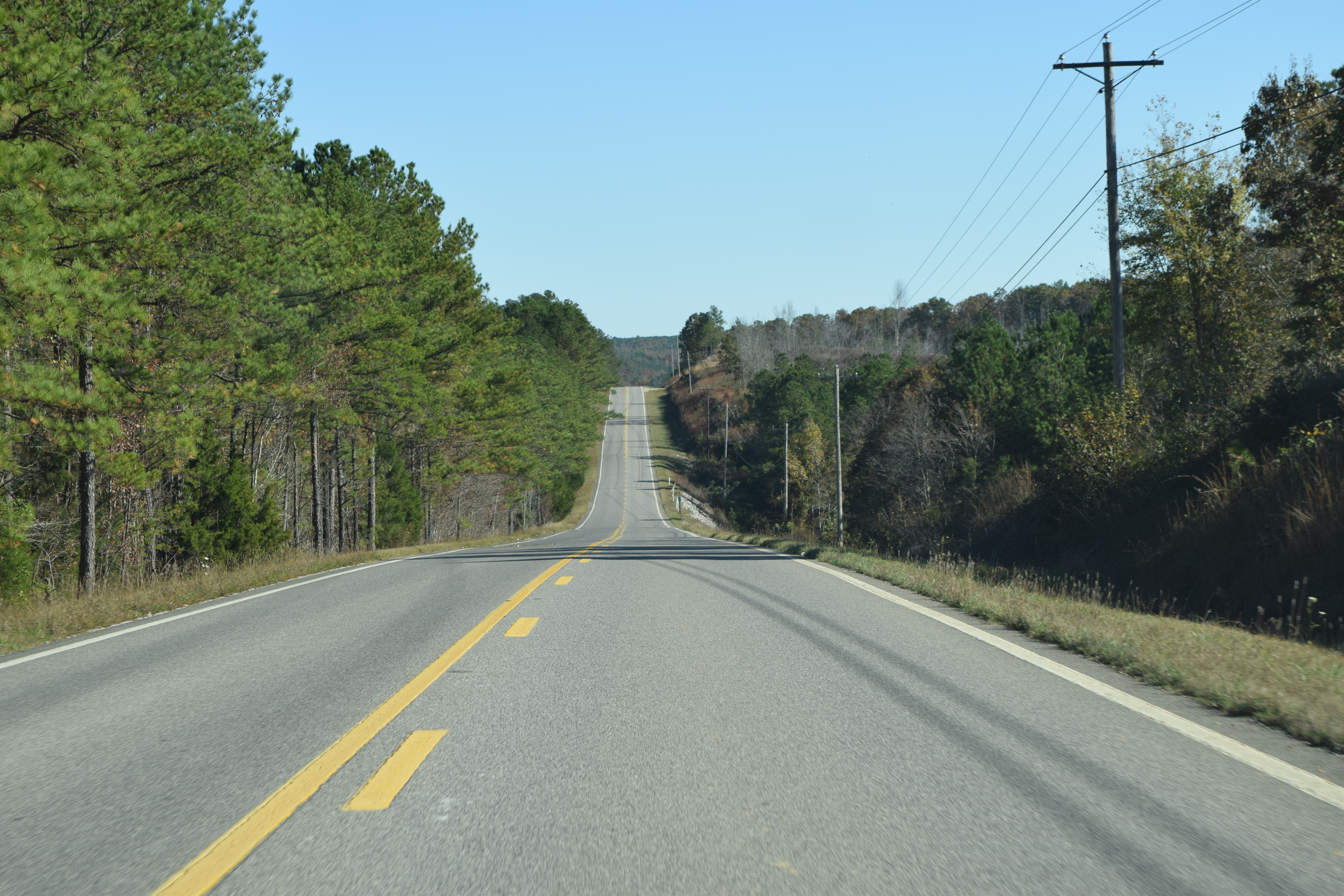
State Route 247 in Franklin County

SR 247 begins at an intersection with SR 24 east of Halltown. From this point, the route travels in a northeasterly direction to its northern end at US 72 to the west of Muscle Shoals.

== Major intersections ==
| County | Location | mi | km | Destinations | Notes |
|---|---|---|---|---|---|
| Franklin | | 0.000 | 0.000 | SR 24 – Red Bay, Russellville | Southern terminus |
| Colbert | | 24.849 | 39.991 | US 72 (SR 2) – Muscle Shoals, Cherokee | Northern terminus |
1.000 mi = 1.609 km; 1.000 km = 0.621 mi
