= Bounds Crossroads, Mississippi =

- Unincorporated community
- Location within Mississippi Location within the United States
- Coordinates: 34°19′45″N 88°12′44″W
- Country: United States
- State: Mississippi
- County: Itawamba
- Elevation: 433 ft (132 m)
- Time zone: UTC-6 (Central (CST))
  - Summer (DST): UTC-5 (CDT)
- GNIS feature ID: 691721

Bounds Crossroads is a small unincorporated community in Itawamba County, Mississippi between Tremont, Mississippi and Red Bay, Alabama on Mississippi Highway 23. Tammy Wynette grew up in the area and attended Tremont Attendance Center in Tremont where she played basketball, sang, and was named Miss THS. Mississippi Highway 23 intersects Mt. Gilead Road and Hartsell Road in Bounds Crossroads. The area's zip code is 38876. Briar Creek runs through the hilly area of eastern Itawamba County. A small graveyard is in the area. The nearby Red Bay Museum in Red Bay, Alabama has a collection related to Wynette.
