= Jim Lovette =

American football player

Samford Bulldogs
- Position: Quarterback

Personal information
- Born: Red Bay, Alabama

Career information
- College: Samford (1967)

Jim Lovette was a college football player and record-setting quarterback for the Samford Bulldogs football team. He was from Red Bay, Alabama.
