= Millville, Alabama =

Millville is the name of two populated places in the US state of Alabama:

- Millville, Lamar County, Alabama
- Millville, Sumter County, Alabama
