= Cadamy, Mississippi =

- Unincorporated community
- Location within Mississippi Location within the United States
- Coordinates: 34°10′53″N 88°15′33″W
- Country: United States
- State: Mississippi
- County: Itawamba
- Elevation: 351 ft (107 m)
- Time zone: UTC-6 (Central (CST))
  - Summer (DST): UTC-5 (CDT)
- Area code: 662
- GNIS feature ID: 667899

Cadamy is an unincorporated community in Itawamba County, Mississippi, United States, located on Mississippi Highway 23 south of Tremont.
