= Atwood, Alabama =

Unincorporated community in Alabama, United States

- Unincorporated community
- Location in Alabama
- Coordinates: 34°21′38″N 87°59′42″W
- Country: United States
- State: Alabama
- County: Franklin
- Elevation: 741 ft (226 m)
- Time zone: UTC-6 (Central (CST))
  - Summer (DST): UTC-5 (CDT)
- ZIP code: 35571
- GNIS feature ID: 113274

Atwood is an unincorporated community located in southern Franklin County, Alabama, United States. It is located along Alabama Highway 172 between the towns of Hodges and Vina. Atwood is situated just south of the Bear Creek Reservoir.

== History ==
Atwood was named after Abner Atwood, a local physician. A post office was established in the town in 1898, but was later closed.
