= Halltown, Alabama =

Unincorporated community in Alabama, United States

- Unincorporated community
- Location within Alabama Location within the United States
- Coordinates: 34°27′11″N 88°03′41″W
- Country: United States
- State: Alabama
- County: Franklin
- Elevation: 663 ft (202 m)
- Time zone: UTC-6 (Central (CST))
  - Summer (DST): UTC-5 (CDT)
- Area codes: 256 and 938
- GNIS feature ID: 119606

Halltown, also known as Alanthus, is an unincorporated community in Franklin County, Alabama, United States. Halltown is located along Alabama State Route 24, 4.9 miles (7.9 km) east-northeast of Red Bay.

== History ==
Halltown is likely named for John T. Hall, the first postmaster of the community. A post office operated under the name Alanthus from 1881 to 1909.
