= Liberty Hill, Franklin County, Alabama =

Unincorporated community in Alabama, United States

Liberty Hill, Alabama
- Unincorporated community
- Location within Alabama Location within the United States
- Coordinates: 34°20′51″N 87°45′54″W
- Country: United States
- State: Alabama
- County: Franklin
- Elevation: 981 ft (299 m)
- Time zone: UTC-6 (Central (CST))
  - Summer (DST): UTC-5 (CDT)
- Area codes: 205, 659
- GNIS feature ID: 121568

Liberty Hill is an unincorporated community in Franklin County, Alabama, United States. Liberty Hill is located on U.S. Route 43 and Alabama State Route 17, 3.4 miles (5.5 km) west of Phil Campbell.
