= Pleasant Site, Alabama =

Unincorporated community in Alabama, United States

- Unincorporated community
- Location within Alabama Location within the United States
- Coordinates: 34°32′31″N 88°03′55″W
- Country: United States
- State: Alabama
- County: Franklin
- Elevation: 515 ft (157 m)
- Time zone: UTC-6 (Central (CST))
  - Summer (DST): UTC-5 (CDT)
- Area codes: 205, 659
- GNIS feature ID: 125042

Pleasant Site is an unincorporated community in Franklin County, Alabama, United States.

== History ==
The name Pleasant Site comes from a subjectively descriptive term of the surrounding area. A post office operated under the name Pleasant Site from 1843 to 1911.

During the Civil War, Company B of the 27th Alabama Infantry (known as the "Confederate Sentinels") was organized at Pleasant Site. The last surviving Confederate veteran in Franklin County, Allen Haley Taylor, is buried in Pleasant Site.
