= Charles Sallis =

American historian and writer (1934–2024)

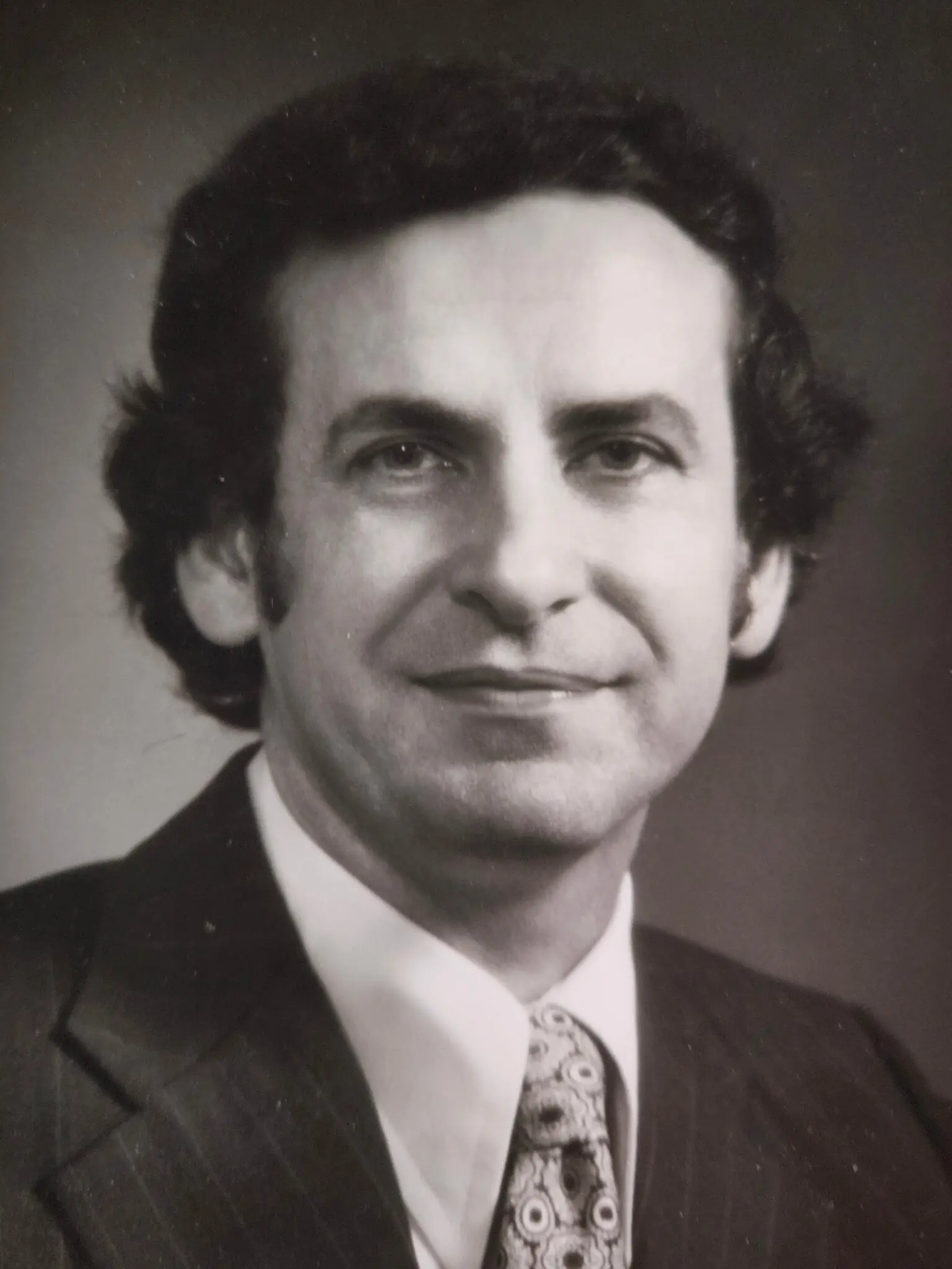
- Sallis in 1976
- Born: William Charles Sallis; August 27, 1934; Tremont, Mississippi, U.S.
- Died: February 5, 2024 (aged 89); Jackson, Mississippi, U.S.
- Education: Mississippi State University; University of Kentucky
- Occupations: Historian, writer

William Charles Sallis (August 27, 1934 – February 5, 2024) was an American historian and writer.

== Life and career ==
Sallis was born in Tremont, Mississippi, the son of William Lazarus Sallis, a United States Department of Agriculture worker, and Myrtle Cody. He attended and graduated from Greenville High School. After graduating, he attended Mississippi State University, earning his BS and MS degrees in education in 1956, which after earning his degrees, he served as a second lieutenant in the United States Army. After his discharge, he attended the University of Kentucky, earning his Ph.D. degree in history in 1967.

Sallis worked as a history professor at Millsaps College from 1968 to 2000. During his years as a history professor, in 1974, he and sociologist James W. Loewen authored the Mississippi history textbook, Mississippi: Conflict & Change. Their textbook won the Lillian Smith Book Award in 1976.

== Death ==
Sallis died on February 5, 2024, at his home in Jackson, Mississippi, at the age of 89.
