= WKAX =

- Russellville, Alabama; United States
- Frequency: 1500 kHz

Programming
- Format: Urban Gospel

Ownership
- Owner: Knox Media Group

History
- First air date: April 3, 1974

Technical information
- Licensing authority: FCC
- Facility ID: 57623
- Class: D
- Power: 1,000 watts (day only)
- Transmitter coordinates: 34°31′42″N 87°42′41″W

Links
- Public license information: Public file; LMS

WKAX (1500 AM) is a radio station licensed to serve Russellville, Alabama. The station is owned by Pilati Investments, Inc., and was operated under a local marketing agreement by Knox Media Group. It airs an urban gospel format from sunrise to sunset.

== History ==
WKAX signed on as a new AM radio station with 1,000 watts of power, daytime only, at 1500 kHz on April 3, 1974. The station was put on the air under the ownership of the Russellville Broadcasting Co., Inc.

In December 1978, Russellville Broadcasting Co., Inc., reached an agreement to sell this station to Cumberland Foundation, Inc. The deal was eventually approved by the FCC on March 13, 1981.

In January 1988, Cumberland Foundation, Inc., made a deal to sell this station to William Perkins. The deal was approved by the FCC on February 29, 1988.

In September 1990, William Perkins reached an agreement to sell this station to Ronnie E. Underwood. The deal was approved by the FCC on October 24, 1990, and the transaction was consummated on November 10, 1990. In January 1991, Ronnie E. Underwood transferred the license for this station to a partnership co-owned by Ronnie E. Underwood and his wife Wanda P. Underwood. The shift was approved by the FCC on January 16, 1991, and the transaction was consummated on February 1, 1991.

In November 1999, Ronnie E. and Wanda Underwood (spouses) agreed to sell this station to Jamar Communications Inc. (Marshall R. Moore, president) for a reported sale price of $65,000. The deal was approved by the FCC on December 13, 1999, and the transaction was consummated on January 18, 2000.

In December 2005, Jamar Communications Inc. contracted to sell this station to Pilati Investments Inc. for a cash and debt combined sale price of $55,000. The deal was approved by the FCC on June 1, 2006, and the transaction was consummated on July 6, 2006.
