= Tonya Suzanne Holly =

American film and casting director, producer

Tonya Suzanne Holly (born July 2, 1962, Red Bay, Alabama) is an American film and theatre producer who studied theater at University of North Alabama.

Holly worked as set production assistant on Toy Soldiers (1991), casting assistant (Alabama) on Raw Nerve (1991) and extras casting for Blue Sky. While located in Alabama, Holly has traveled for CBS, HBO, NBC, FOX, Morgan Creek, Universal, Buena Vista, and other productions.

Production of The Story of Bonnie and Clyde (2009) starring Sean Faris as Clyde Barrow and Lindsay Pulsipher as Bonnie Parker was halted. Casting of the movie was delayed and production was dealt a major setback in April 2011 as tornadoes damaged or destroyed film locations in Mississippi and Alabama. Flooding prevented filming at the state prison in Angola and the film has not moved beyond the "in development" stage since 2009.

Holly founded the now defunct Alabama Filmmakers Association in 1991 to help promote film in the state of Alabama.

== Cypress Moon Studios ==
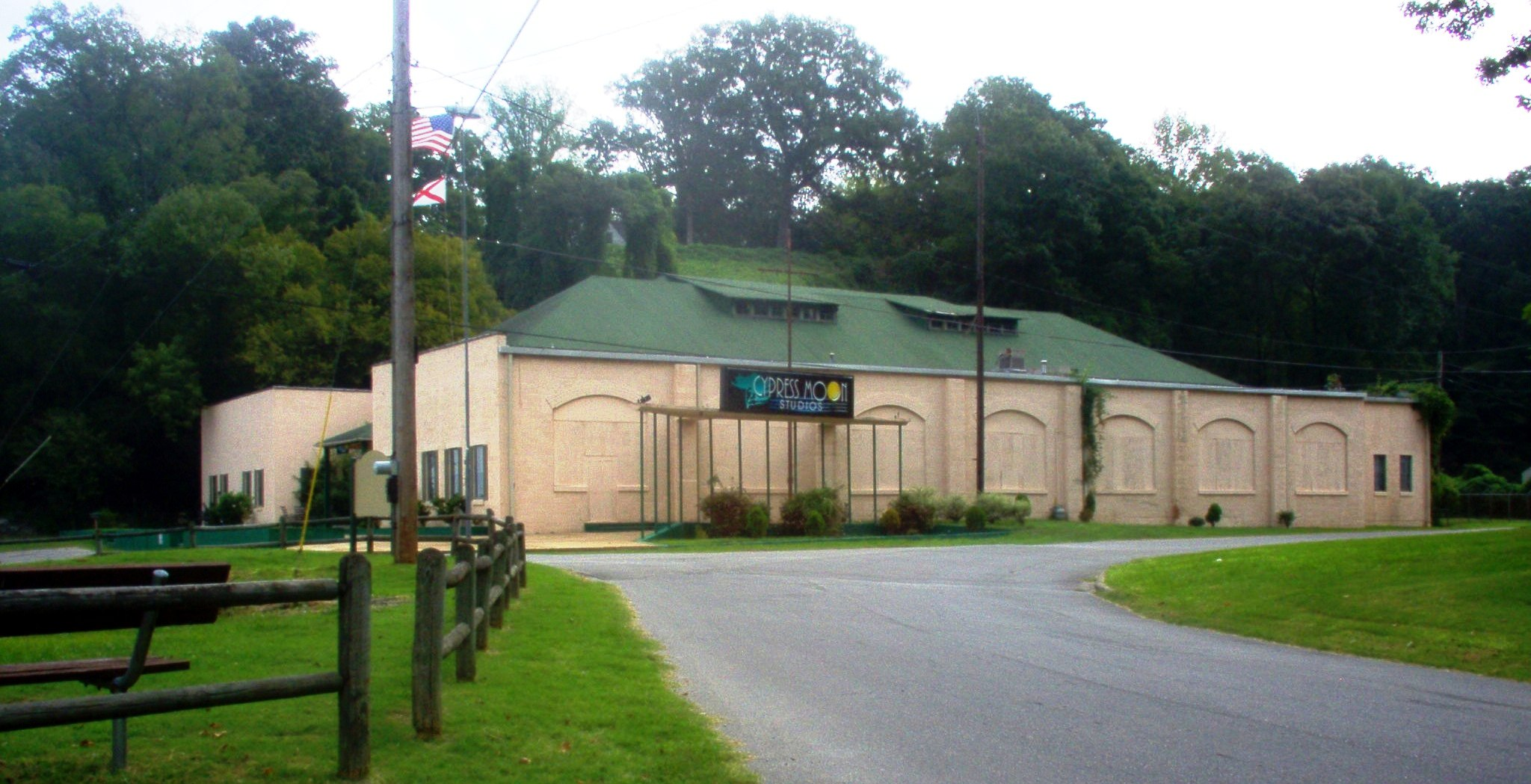
The new facilities are now home to Cypress Moon Studios.

Holly is the owner and president of Cypress Moon Studios located in buildings that were previously the location of Muscle Shoals Sound Studio in Sheffield, Alabama.

== Movies directed by Tonya Holly ==
- When I Find the Ocean (2006)
- The Mirror (2003)
- The Story of Bonnie and Clyde (In development since 2009)
- Sleeping Giants: The Union of the Seven (Out of production)
