= Burnout, Alabama =

Unincorporated community in Alabama, United States

- Unincorporated community
- Location within Alabama Location within the United States
- Coordinates: 34°27′03″N 88°01′22″W
- Country: United States
- State: Alabama
- County: Franklin
- Elevation: 745 ft (227 m)
- Time zone: UTC-6 (Central (CST))
  - Summer (DST): UTC-5 (CDT)
- Area codes: 256 & 938
- GNIS feature ID: 115270

Burnout is an unincorporated community in Franklin County, Alabama, United States.
