= Spruce Pine, Alabama =

Unincorporated community in Alabama, United States

- Census-designated place
- Location of Spruce Pine in Franklin County, Alabama.
- Coordinates: 34°23′34″N 87°43′46″W
- Country: United States
- State: Alabama
- County: Franklin

Area
  - Total: 0.93 sq mi (2.41 km^{2})
  - Land: 0.93 sq mi (2.40 km^{2})
  - Water: 0 sq mi (0.00 km^{2})
- Elevation: 1,017 ft (310 m)

Population (2020)
  - Total: 215
  - Density: 231.7/sq mi (89.47/km^{2})
- Time zone: UTC-6 (Central (CST))
  - Summer (DST): UTC-5 (CDT)
- Area codes: 256 & 938
- GNIS feature ID: 2628604

Spruce Pine is a census-designated place and unincorporated community in Franklin County, Alabama, United States. As of the 2020 census, Spruce Pine had a population of 215.

== Demographics ==
Historical population
Census	Pop.	Note	%±
2010	222		—
2020	215		−3.2%
U.S. Decennial Census

Spruce Pine was listed as a census designated place in the 2010 U.S. census.

Spruce Pine CDP, Alabama – Racial and ethnic composition Note: the US Census treats Hispanic/Latino as an ethnic category. This table excludes Latinos from the racial categories and assigns them to a separate category. Hispanics/Latinos may be of any race.
Race / Ethnicity (NH = Non-Hispanic)	Pop 2010	Pop 2020	% 2010	% 2020
White alone (NH)	209	175	94.14%	81.40%
Black or African American alone (NH)	0	3	0.00%	1.40%
Native American or Alaska Native alone (NH)	0	0	0.00%	0.00%
Asian alone (NH)	0	0	0.00%	0.00%
Native Hawaiian or Pacific Islander alone (NH)	0	0	0.00%	0.00%
Other race alone (NH)	0	1	0.00%	0.47%
Mixed race or Multiracial (NH)	0	11	0.00%	5.12%
Hispanic or Latino (any race)	13	25	5.86%	11.63%
Total	222	215	100.00%	100.00%
