= Pogo, Alabama =

Unincorporated community in Alabama, United States

- Unincorporated community
- Location within Alabama Location within the United States
- Coordinates: 34°33′26″N 88°06′50″W
- Country: United States
- State: Alabama
- County: Franklin
- Elevation: 528 ft (161 m)
- Time zone: UTC-6 (Central (CST))
  - Summer (DST): UTC-5 (CDT)
- Area code: 256
- GNIS feature ID: 156914

Pogo is an unincorporated community in Franklin County, Alabama, United States, close to the border with Mississippi.
