= WPMR-LP =

- Russellville, Alabama; United States
- Frequency: 95.7 MHz

Programming
- Format: Southern Gospel

Ownership
- Owner: Provision Ministry

History
- First air date: April 8, 2003
- Call sign meaning: Provision Ministry Radio

Technical information
- Licensing authority: FCC
- Facility ID: 134788
- Class: L1
- ERP: 13 watts
- HAAT: 81.8 meters (268 feet)
- Transmitter coordinates: 34°30′08″N 87°45′04″W

Links
- Public license information: LMS

WPMR-LP (95.7 FM) is a radio station licensed to serve Russellville, Alabama. The station is owned by Provision Ministry. It airs a Southern Gospel music format.

== History ==
This station received its original construction permit from the Federal Communications Commission on April 8, 2003. The new station was assigned the call letters WPMR-LP by the FCC on June 18, 2003. WPMR-LP received its license to cover from the FCC on June 18, 2004.

Previously the WPMR callsign (for "Pocono Mountain Radio") had been assigned to WPMR (960 AM, later WPLY) and WPMR-FM (107.9 FM, now WKRF) in Mount Pocono/Tobyhanna Township, Pennsylvania.
