= Nix, Alabama =

Unincorporated community in Alabama, United States

- Unincorporated community
- Location within Alabama Location within the United States
- Coordinates: 34°21′05″N 87°47′03″W
- Country: United States
- State: Alabama
- County: Franklin
- Elevation: 965 ft (294 m)
- Time zone: UTC-6 (Central (CST))
  - Summer (DST): UTC-5 (CDT)
- Area codes: 205, 659

Nix is an unincorporated community in Franklin County, Alabama, United States.
