= Alabama State Route 24 =

State highway in Alabama, United States

State Route 24

Route information
- Maintained by ALDOT
- Length: 71 mi (114 km)

Major junctions
- West end: MS 76 at Mississippi state line west of Red Bay
- SR 19 at Red Bay; US 43 / SR 17 / SR 13 at Russellville; SR 243 at Russellville; SR 101 at Mt. Hope; SR 33 at Moulton; SR 157 at Moulton; SR 67 at Decatur
- East end: Moulton Street in Decatur

Location
- Country: United States
- State: Alabama
- Counties: Franklin, Lawrence, Morgan

Highway system
- Alabama State Highway System; Interstate; US; State
← SR 23	→ SR 25

State Route 24 (SR 24) is a 71-mile-long (114 km) state highway in the northwestern and north-central part of the state. The western terminus of the route is near Red Bay at the Mississippi state line, where it continues as Mississippi Highway 76 (MS 76). The eastern terminus of the route is near the junction with SR 67 at Decatur, where it continues for 2 miles as Moulton Street. Moulton Street (without SR 24) ends east of US 31. The route is one of several segments that comprises Corridor V of the Appalachian Development Highway System. Corridor V provides a continuous route between Batesville, Mississippi and Chattanooga, Tennessee. For the most part, SR 24 is a four-lane divided expressway.

== Route description ==
SR 24 begins at SR 67. At travels west as a four-lane divided highway, carrying on the name of Appalachian Development Highway System's Corridor V from the mile-long stretch of SR 67 in between SR 24 and SR 20.

The route climbs up into the Moulton Valley, progressively flattening as it continues towards Moulton. The route bypasses the town, intersecting the four-lane undivided SR 157. It continues west along a rural, mostly flat and straight routing to outside Russellville.

In Russellville, the route intersects U.S. 43 before climbing up into the Fall Line Hills, separating the Gulf Coastal Plain from the Appalachian Plateaus. The route follows a mostly winding, rolling route to the Mississippi state line, continuing onward into Mississippi as Mississippi Highway 76.

The route is mostly an important connector—Alongside SR 157—to the larger cities of Northwest Alabama. As of 2021, the entirety of Alabama State Route 24 from Alabama State Route 67 west to the Mississippi border is four-laned.

== Route history ==
In Decatur, Alabama, State Route 24 underwent several different routings from its creation to the present day. In its early years (1928 - 1960), the route headed through Decatur on what is now Moulton Street, a straight road from S.R. 67 to U.S. 31. In the early 1960s, the routing from Danville Road west was changed, heading south on Danville Road to 2nd Street before turning west, following 2nd Street to Gordon Drive, a then-new overpass thoroughfare over the railroads of Decatur; it would proceed to follow Gordon Drive to U.S. 31. In the mid 70's, Gordon Drive was completed from Moulton Street east to the 2nd Street/Gordon Drive Overpass junction. It would follow the now extended Gordon Drive and Moulton Street over to Danville Road (where the previous routing turned south) before proceeding west. In the 90's, the route signage was removed east of S.R. 67, now leaving the actual terminus and routing of S.R. 24 unknown within the confines of Decatur.

From the route's creation in 1928 to sometime in 1952 or 1953, Alabama State Route 24 from Decatur to Moulton winded along present-day Morgan County Road 61 to Five Points, then following present-day County Road 87 from Five Points to Moulton. This corridor is still known as 'Old Moulton Road' in Morgan County to this day. In 1953, the route was routed along what is now known locally as 'Old 24' from Decatur to Moulton; a route that was more direct than the former, albeit passing through several cities. Around 1980, construction of a new four-lane divided highway south of the current route had begun, extending from Alabama State Route 67 to a stub in Landersville. SR-24 was rerouted onto this new highway bypassing formerly-served towns and Moulton around 1984/1985.

Current-Day Lawrence County Route 460 - which is located south of current-day SR-24 - held the SR-24 designation from Landersville west to Russellville as late as the mid-2000s while the four-lane divided stretch was being extended west from the stub in Landersville to another stub in western Russellville. After the rerouting of SR-24 from Landersville to Russellville, the stretch was renamed County Road 460; this designation carries this title along old State Route 24 across Lawrence County. Abandoned and overgrown paving from the routing deviation onto now-County Road 460 is still visible on satellite and ground; although the stub is no longer existent and the divided highway is continuous.

The final stretch of AL-24 to start realignment work was the stretch from Russellville to Red Bay. Arguably the hilliest stretch of State Route 24, this portion of the four-lane divided highway required several ridge cuts and extensive terrain work to complete. The two-lane route it replaced winded on both sides of the new highway, much curvier than the new route. Unlike the rest of old SR-24, this former stretch is impossible to traverse completely due to several bridges being cut along the stretch. Several county roads in Franklin County wind on both sides of the route, carrying the designations 'County Road -24'; with the prefix being sequenced from west to east from 'County Road 124' to 'County Road 724'. All of these county roads once carried the SR-24 name. Each of these county routes start at a junction with 'New 24' and end at a severed bridge or a second junction with the new highway - none of these county routes have a concurrency with the new highway.

== Major intersections ==
County	Location	mi	km	Destinations	Notes
Franklin	Red Bay	0.000	0.000	MS 76 west – Tremont	Mississippi state line
Franklin	Red Bay	1.776	2.858	SR 19 – Red Bay, Vina	Interchange
Franklin		5.290	8.513	SR 247 north – Tuscumbia, Cedar Creek Dam	Southern terminus of SR 247
Franklin	Belgreen	18.199	29.288	SR 187 south – Vina	Northern terminus of SR 187
Franklin	Russellville	26.330	42.374	US 43 / SR 13 / SR 17 – Russellville, Muscle Shoals, Hamilton	Interchange
Franklin	Russellville	26.915	43.315	SR 243 south – Double Springs	Northern terminus of SR 243
Lawrence	Mount Hope, Lawrence County	43.616	70.193	SR 101 – Mount Hope, Lawrence County	
Lawrence	Moulton	51.785	83.340	SR 33 – Moulton, Double Springs, Courtland	
Lawrence	Moulton	52.530	84.539	SR 157 – Muscle Shoals, Cullman	
Morgan	Decatur	69.606	112.020	SR 67 (Beltline Road) / Moulton Street	Interchange
1.000 mi = 1.609 km; 1.000 km = 0.621 mi
