= King Drive-In =

- Interactive map of King Drive-In
- Address: 18478 Highway 43; Russellville, Alabama; United States
- Coordinates: 34.5251°N 87.5260°W
- Type: Drive-In Movie

Construction
- Opened: 1949
- Years active: 1949-2023

The King Drive-In is a historic drive-in theater located in Russellville, Alabama. It was the oldest continually operating drive-in theater in the state of Alabama until its closure in 2023.

== History ==
The King Drive-In began showing films in 1949 when it was originally owned by namesake A.L. King. King's son, Morgan, took over operations in 1974. Traditionally, the theater screened films throughout the summer at this time when local children and teenagers were out of school. In more recent years, the drive in has opened earlier during the Spring and also remained open into the Fall.

== Today ==
The King Drive-In was among the last continually operating drive-in theaters in Alabama. It survived for more than 60 years in Franklin County, despite the additions of digital screens in Florence, Alabama, as well as the attraction of area high school football games during the fall months. Prior to its closure in 2023, it upgraded its facilities to include the transmission of sound through FM radio, as well as an upgraded screen and projector.

Prior to its dissolution, the King Drive-In operated with double and sometimes triple features on Friday, Saturday and Sunday nights. Trailers for upcoming films were played in between films to give customers time for concessions or a restroom break. The location was known as a gathering point for area youths and family on summer weekend nights.
