= Old Burleson, Alabama =

Unincorporated community in Alabama, United States

- Unincorporated community
- Location within Alabama Location within the United States
- Coordinates: 34°24′39″N 88°02′12″W
- Country: United States
- State: Alabama
- County: Franklin
- Elevation: 620 ft (190 m)
- Time zone: UTC-6 (Central (CST))
  - Summer (DST): UTC-5 (CDT)
- Area codes: 205, 659
- GNIS feature ID: 124202

Old Burleson is an unincorporated community in Franklin County, Alabama, United States.

A post office operated under the name Burleson from 1848 to 1909.
