= Russellville City Schools =

School district in Alabama, United States

Conecuh County School District

Address
- 1945 Waterloo Rd Russellville, Franklin County, Alabama, 35653-5432; United States

District information
- Grades: PK-12
- Superintendent: Heath Grimes
- School board: 5
- Schools: 5
- NCES District ID: 0100870
- District ID: AL-189

Students and staff
- Students: 2,614
- Teachers: 149.7 (on an FTE basis)
- Staff: 124.85 (on an FTE basis)
- Student–teacher ratio: 17.46:1

Other information
- Website: www.rcs.k12.al.us

Russellville City Schools is a school district in Russellville, Alabama, United States. The school mascot is the Golden Tigers.

== Schools ==
- Russellville High School
- Russellville Middle School
- Russellville Elementary School
- West Elementary School
- Russellville City Career Tech Center
