= Franklin County, Alabama =

County in Alabama, United States

- County
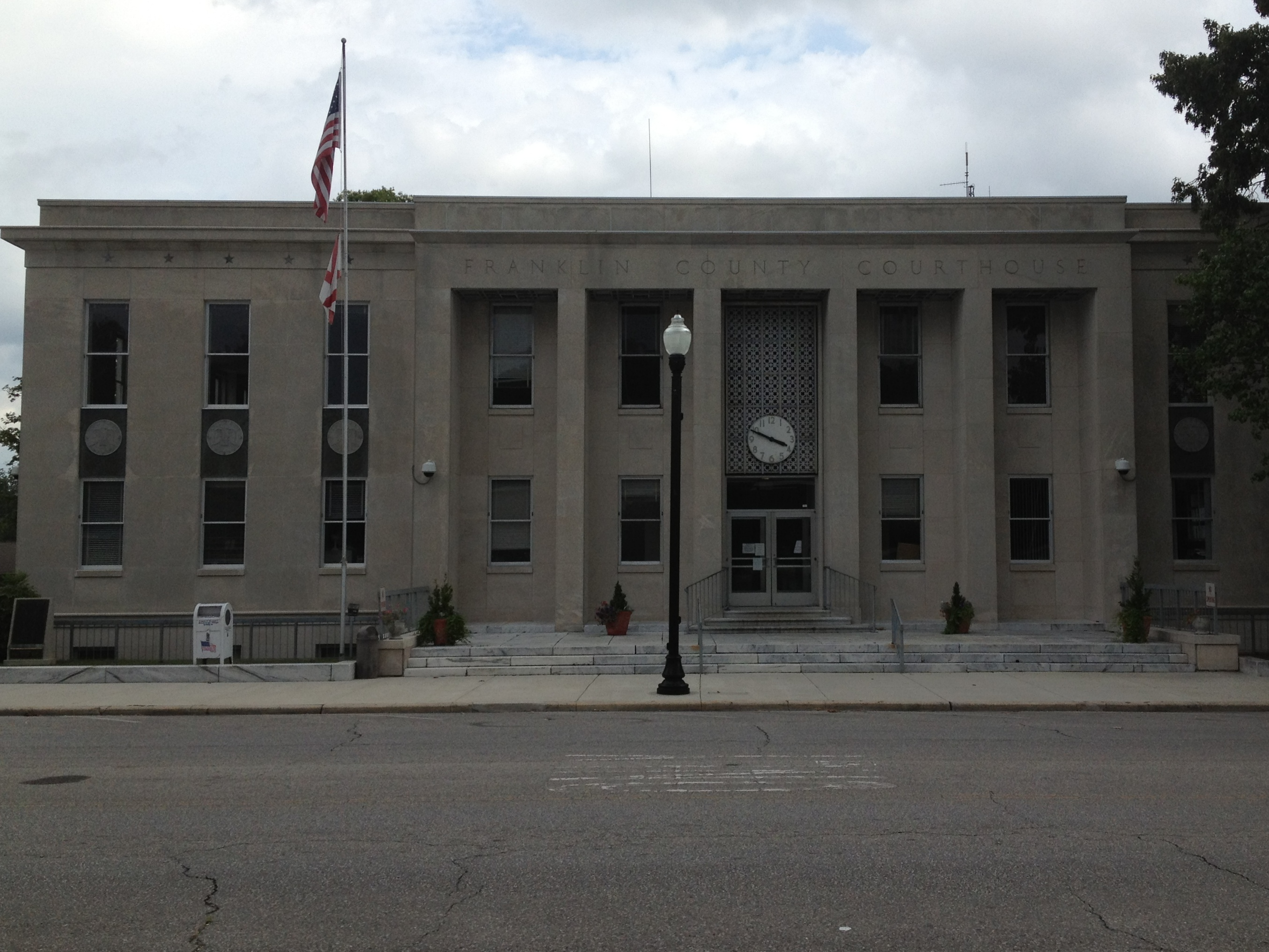
- Franklin County Courthouse in Russellville

- Seal

- Location within the U.S. state of Alabama
- Coordinates: 34°26′00″N 87°51′00″W
- Country: United States
- State: Alabama
- Founded: February 6, 1818
- Named for: Benjamin Franklin
- Seat: Russellville
- Largest city: Russellville

Area
  - Total: 647 sq mi (1,680 km^{2})
  - Land: 634 sq mi (1,640 km^{2})
  - Water: 13 sq mi (34 km^{2}) 2.0%

Population (2020)
  - Total: 32,113
  - Estimate (2025): 32,449 ▲
  - Density: 50.7/sq mi (19.6/km^{2})
- Time zone: UTC−6 (Central)
  - Summer (DST): UTC−5 (CDT)
- Congressional district: 4th
- Website: www.franklincountyal.org
- County Number 33 on Alabama Licence Plates

Franklin County is a county located in the U.S. state of Alabama. As of the 2020 census, the population was 32,113. Its county seat is Russellville. Its name is in honor of Benjamin Franklin, famous statesman, scientist, and printer. It is a dry county, although the city of Russellville is wet.

== History ==
Franklin County was established on February 6, 1818.

=== Colbert County ===
Once part of Franklin County, Colbert County was originally established on February 6, 1867, after it split from Franklin County over political issues after the American Civil War. It was abolished eight months later by an Alabama constitutional convention and then reestablished on February 24, 1870.

=== Musical history ===
Many musicians and songwriters are from Franklin County including Billy Sherrill, Ricky Pierce, Kerry Gilbert, Eddie Martin and many others.

== Geography ==
According to the United States Census Bureau, the county has a total area of 647 square miles (1,680 km^{2}), of which 634 square miles (1,640 km^{2}) is land and 13 square miles (34 km^{2}) (2.0%) is water.

=== Adjacent counties ===
- Colbert County (north)
- Lawrence County (east)
- Winston County (southeast)
- Marion County (south)
- Itawamba County, Mississippi (southwest)
- Tishomingo County, Mississippi (northwest)

=== National protected area ===
- William B. Bankhead National Forest (part)

== Transportation ==
=== Major highways ===
- U.S. Highway 43 / State Route 17
- State Route 13
- State Route 19
- State Route 24
- State Route 172
- State Route 187
- State Route 237
- State Route 241
- State Route 243
- State Route 247

=== Rail ===
- Norfolk Southern Railway
- Redmont Railway

== Demographics ==
Historical population
Census	Pop.	Note	%±
1820	4,988		—
1830	11,078		122.1%
1840	14,270		28.8%
1850	19,610		37.4%
1860	18,627		−5.0%
1870	8,006		−57.0%
1880	9,155		14.4%
1890	10,681		16.7%
1900	16,511		54.6%
1910	19,369		17.3%
1920	22,011		13.6%
1930	25,372		15.3%
1940	27,552		8.6%
1950	25,705		−6.7%
1960	21,988		−14.5%
1970	23,933		8.8%
1980	28,350		18.5%
1990	27,814		−1.9%
2000	31,223		12.3%
2010	31,704		1.5%
2020	32,113		1.3%
2025 (est.)	32,449	▲	1.0%
U.S. Decennial Census; 1790–1960 1900–1990; 1990–2000 2010–2020

=== 2020 census ===
As of the 2020 United States census, the county had a population of 32,113. The median age was 38.3 years. 25.5% of residents were under the age of 18 and 17.1% of residents were 65 years of age or older. For every 100 females there were 97.7 males, and for every 100 females age 18 and over there were 95.3 males age 18 and over.

The racial makeup of the county was 75.8% White, 3.6% Black or African American, 2.0% American Indian and Alaska Native, 0.2% Asian, 0.0% Native Hawaiian and Pacific Islander, 13.4% from some other race, and 5.0% from two or more races. Hispanic or Latino residents of any race comprised 19.5% of the population.

31.0% of residents lived in urban areas, while 69.0% lived in rural areas.

There were 12,142 households in the county, of which 34.0% had children under the age of 18 living with them and 26.7% had a female householder with no spouse or partner present. About 25.8% of all households were made up of individuals and 12.0% had someone living alone who was 65 years of age or older.

There were 13,912 housing units, of which 12.7% were vacant. Among occupied housing units, 68.1% were owner-occupied and 31.9% were renter-occupied. The homeowner vacancy rate was 1.8% and the rental vacancy rate was 8.0%.

=== Racial and ethnic composition ===
Franklin County, Alabama – Racial and ethnic composition Note: the US Census treats Hispanic/Latino as an ethnic category. This table excludes Latinos from the racial categories and assigns them to a separate category. Hispanics/Latinos may be of any race.
Race / Ethnicity (NH = Non-Hispanic)	Pop 2000	Pop 2010	Pop 2020	% 2000	% 2010	% 2020
White alone (NH)	27,268	25,249	23,581	87.33%	79.64%	73.43%
Black or African American alone (NH)	1,307	1,211	1,139	4.19%	3.82%	3.55%
Native American or Alaska Native alone (NH)	87	121	128	0.28%	0.38%	0.40%
Asian alone (NH)	32	51	67	0.10%	0.16%	0.21%
Pacific Islander alone (NH)	3	2	2	0.01%	0.01%	0.01%
Other race alone (NH)	5	32	77	0.02%	0.10%	0.24%
Mixed race or Multiracial (NH)	205	328	860	0.66%	1.03%	2.68%
Hispanic or Latino (any race)	2,316	4,710	6,259	7.42%	14.86%	19.49%
Total	31,223	31,704	32,113	100.00%	100.00%	100.00%

=== 2010 census ===
At the 2010 census there were 31,704 people, 12,286 households, and 8,741 families living in the county. The population density was 57 people per square mile (22 people/km^{2}). There were 14,022 housing units at an average density of 21.7 units per square mile (8.4 units/km^{2}). The racial makeup of the county was 83.0% White (non-Hispanic), 3.9% Black or African American, 0.7% Native American, 0.2% Asian, 0.0% Pacific Islander, 10.5% from other races, and 1.7% from two or more races. 14.9% of the population were Hispanic or Latino of any race. Of the 12,286 households 30.0% had children under the age of 18 living with them, 53.5% were married couples living together, 12.3% had a female householder with no husband present, and 28.9% were non-families. 26.1% of households were one person and 12.3% were one person aged 65 or older. The average household size was 2.56 and the average family size was 3.05

The age distribution was 24.8% under the age of 18, 8.9% from 18 to 24, 25.8% from 25 to 44, 25.3% from 45 to 64, and 15.2% 65 or older. The median age was 37.8 years. For every 100 females there were 99.7 males. For every 100 females age 18 and over, there were 104.3 males.

The median household income was $33,942 and the median family income was $44,352. Males had a median income of $31,997 versus $22,747 for females. The per capita income for the county was $18,094. About 14.9% of families and 19.5% of the population were below the poverty line, including 26.2% of those under age 18 and 13.2% of those age 65 or over.

=== 2000 census ===
As of the census of 2000, there were 31,223 people, 12,259 households, and 8,949 families living in the county. The population density was 49 people per square mile (19 people/km^{2}). There were 13,749 housing units at an average density of 22 units per square mile (8.5 units/km^{2}). The racial makeup of the county was 89.68% White (non-Hispanic), 4.21% Black or African American, 0.33% Native American, 0.11% Asian, 0.10% Pacific Islander, 4.62% from other races, and 0.96% from two or more races. 5.82% of the population were Hispanic or Latino of any race. Of the 12,259 households 32.50% had children under the age of 18 living with them, 59.20% were married couples living together, 10.40% had a female householder with no husband present, and 27.00% were non-families. 24.50% of households were one person and 12.10% were one person aged 65 or older. The average household size was 2.51 and the average family size was 2.97.

The age distribution was 24.50% under the age of 18, 9.20% from 18 to 24, 28.00% from 25 to 44, 23.40% from 45 to 64, and 14.90% 65 or older. The median age was 37 years. For every 100 females there were 96.40 males. For every 100 females age 18 and over, there were 92.80 males.

The median household income was $27,177 and the median family income was $34,274. Males had a median income of $27,497 versus $18,631 for females. The per capita income for the county was $14,814. About 15.20% of families and 18.90% of the population were below the poverty line, including 24.60% of those under age 18 and 24.10% of those age 65 or over.

== Education ==
There are two school systems and one community college in Franklin County; Russellville City Schools and Franklin County Schools. Northwest–Shoals Community College has a campus in Phil Campbell.

Russellville City Schools include:

- Russellville High School
- Russellville Middle School
- Russellville Elementary School (grades 3 - 5)
- West Elementary School (grades Kindergarten - 2)

Franklin County Schools include:

- Belgreen High School (grades K - 12)
- East Franklin Junior High School (grades K - 9)
- Phil Campbell High School (two separate buildings serving grades K - 12)
- Red Bay High School (grades K - 12)
- Tharptown High School (grades K-12)
- Vina High School (grades K - 12)

There is also the Franklin County Career-Technical Center, located next to Belgreen High School.

== Government ==
Like most rural counties in Alabama, Franklin County has gone solidly Republican in the 21st century, but it has flirted with the party at a federal level since the 1950s. In a pattern typical of most rural Alabama counties, Franklin County supported the Dixiecrats in 1948 and George Wallace in 1968, but unlike other counties, had been won by Republicans in 1956 and 1960, cracking the wall of the Solid South before full-fledged turnover in 1964 and beyond.

As is the case with most rural counties nationwide that supported Bill Clinton in the 1996 election, the county has since turned sharply against the Democratic Party. In 2020, Donald Trump won it over Joe Biden by 83–17 percent, continuing a backsliding trend for Democrats in the rural South.

United States presidential election results for Franklin County, Alabama
Year	Republican		Democratic		Third party(ies)	
Year	No.	%	No.	%	No.	%
1904	668	44.33%	767	50.90%	72	4.78%
1908	652	47.84%	650	47.69%	61	4.48%
1912	309	17.14%	849	47.09%	645	35.77%
1916	984	47.44%	1,044	50.34%	46	2.22%
1920	2,930	57.58%	2,094	41.15%	65	1.28%
1924	22	1.06%	1,985	95.66%	68	3.28%
1928	2,937	56.24%	2,279	43.64%	6	0.11%
1932	1,547	34.71%	2,876	64.53%	34	0.76%
1936	1,875	37.77%	3,059	61.62%	30	0.60%
1940	1,989	35.95%	3,523	63.67%	21	0.38%
1944	1,853	40.56%	2,709	59.30%	6	0.13%
1948	2,555	44.10%	0	0.00%	3,239	55.90%
1952	2,424	41.13%	3,461	58.73%	8	0.14%
1956	3,399	50.21%	3,354	49.55%	16	0.24%
1960	4,069	54.20%	3,422	45.58%	16	0.21%
1964	4,025	56.41%	0	0.00%	3,110	43.59%
1968	2,524	27.75%	588	6.46%	5,984	65.79%
1972	5,877	75.23%	1,840	23.55%	95	1.22%
1976	3,345	34.41%	6,279	64.59%	97	1.00%
1980	4,448	41.33%	6,136	57.01%	179	1.66%
1984	5,304	52.90%	4,601	45.89%	122	1.22%
1988	5,146	50.25%	4,961	48.44%	134	1.31%
1992	4,794	40.43%	5,953	50.20%	1,111	9.37%
1996	4,449	42.44%	5,028	47.97%	1,005	9.59%
2000	6,119	55.11%	4,793	43.17%	191	1.72%
2004	7,690	62.68%	4,514	36.79%	65	0.53%
2008	8,048	68.83%	3,469	29.67%	176	1.51%
2012	7,567	69.54%	3,171	29.14%	143	1.31%
2016	9,466	78.62%	2,197	18.25%	377	3.13%
2020	10,376	82.49%	2,086	16.58%	116	0.92%
2024	10,417	86.11%	1,568	12.96%	112	0.93%

United States Senate election results for Franklin County, Alabama2
Year	Republican		Democratic		Third party(ies)	
Year	No.	%	No.	%	No.	%
2020	9,856	78.97%	2,605	20.87%	20	0.16%

United States Senate election results for Franklin County, Alabama3
Year	Republican		Democratic		Third party(ies)	
Year	No.	%	No.	%	No.	%
2022	6,547	88.02%	770	10.35%	121	1.63%

Alabama Gubernatorial election results for Franklin County
Year	Republican		Democratic		Third party(ies)	
Year	No.	%	No.	%	No.	%
2022	6,592	88.46%	646	8.67%	214	2.87%

== Communities ==
=== Cities ===
- Red Bay
- Russellville (county seat)

=== Towns ===
- Hodges
- Phil Campbell
- Vina

=== Census-designated places ===
- Belgreen
- Spruce Pine

=== Unincorporated communities ===
- Atwood
- Burnout
- Frankfort
- Halltown
- Liberty Hill
- Nix
- Old Burleson
- Pleasant Site
- Pogo

== See also ==
- National Register of Historic Places listings in Franklin County, Alabama
- Properties on the Alabama Register of Landmarks and Heritage in Franklin County, Alabama
