= Vina, Alabama =

- Town
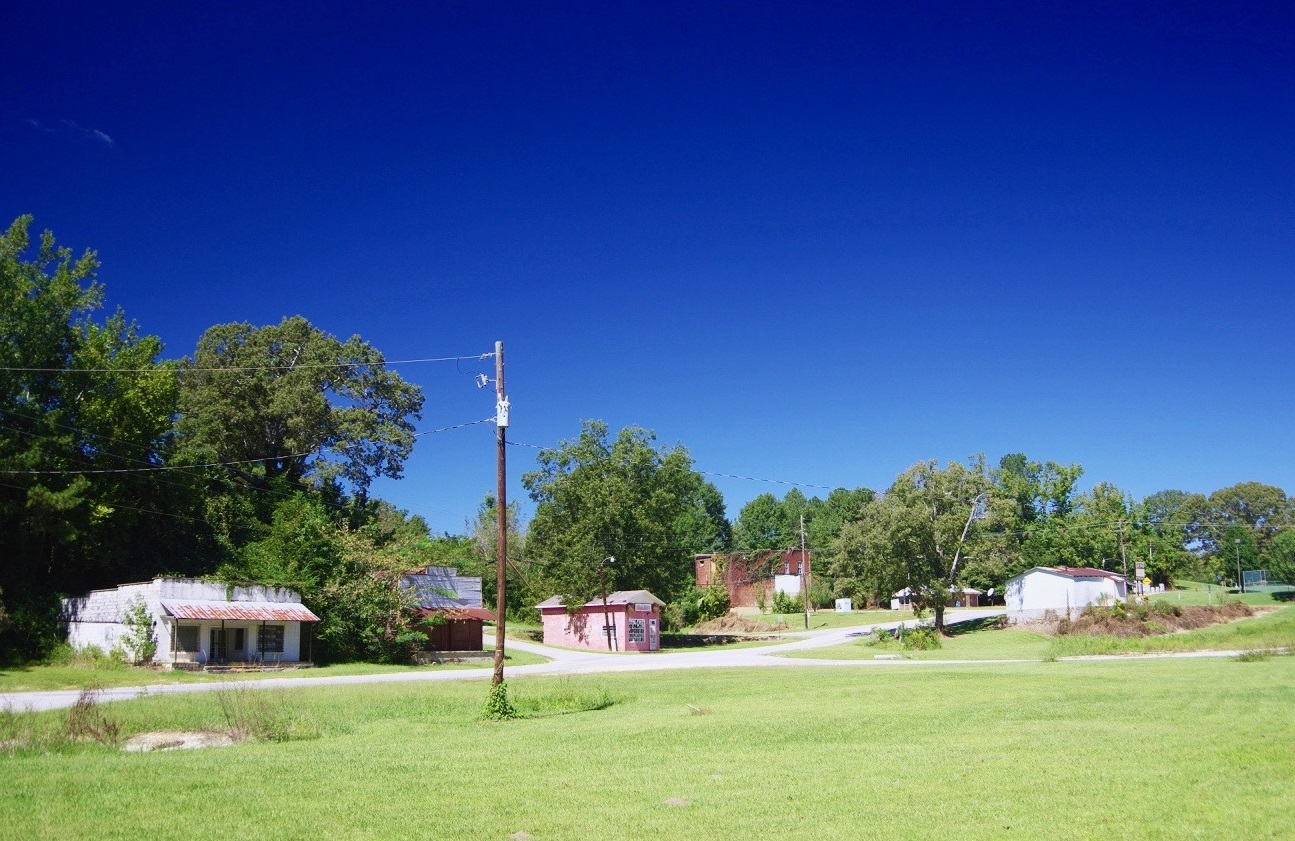
- View along County Road 23 in Vina

- Location of Vina in Franklin County, Alabama.
- Coordinates: 34°22′17″N 88°03′30″W
- Country: United States
- State: Alabama
- County: Franklin

Area
  - Total: 4.81 sq mi (12.45 km^{2})
  - Land: 4.80 sq mi (12.43 km^{2})
  - Water: 0.0039 sq mi (0.01 km^{2})
- Elevation: 689 ft (210 m)

Population (2020)
  - Total: 325
  - Density: 67.7/sq mi (26.14/km^{2})
- Time zone: UTC-6 (Central (CST))
  - Summer (DST): UTC-5 (CDT)
- ZIP code: 35593
- Area code: 256
- FIPS code: 01-78984
- GNIS feature ID: 2406801
- Website: vinaalabama.org

Vina is a town in southwest Franklin County, Alabama, United States. As of the 2020 census, Vina had a population of 325.

== History ==
Vina was incorporated in 1909.

Vina was originally known as "Jones Crossroads," and later as "New Burleson." When a branch of the Illinois Central Railroad was constructed through the area in the early 1900s, the community was renamed "Vina" after the wife of a railroad engineer.

== Geography ==
Vina is located in southwestern Franklin County. Alabama State Route 19 passes through the town, leading northwest 7 miles (11 km) to Red Bay and south 21 miles (34 km) to Hamilton.

According to the U.S. Census Bureau, the town has a total area of 4.8 square miles (12.4 km^{2}), all land. The town sits on the Tennessee Valley Divide, with the north side draining via several creeks to Bear Creek, a north-flowing tributary of the Tennessee River; the south side of town drains to Hurricane Creek, a southwest-flowing part of the Tombigbee River watershed.

== Demographics ==
Historical population
Census	Pop.	Note	%±
1920	339		—
1930	448		32.2%
1940	472		5.4%
1950	313		−33.7%
1960	184		−41.2%
1970	366		98.9%
1980	346		−5.5%
1990	356		2.9%
2000	400		12.4%
2010	358		−10.5%
2020	325		−9.2%
U.S. Decennial Census; 2013 Estimate

As of the census of 2000, there were 400 people, 155 households, and 110 families residing in the town. The population density was 100.2 inhabitants per square mile (38.7/km^{2}). There were 188 housing units at an average density of 47.1 per square mile (18.2/km^{2}). The racial makeup of the town was 97.50% White, 0.50% Black or African American, 0.25% from other races, and 1.75% from two or more races. 1.75% of the population were Hispanic or Latino of any race.

There were 155 households, out of which 31.0% had children under the age of 18 living with them, 41.9% were married couples living together, 21.3% had a female householder with no husband present, and 29.0% were non-families. 26.5% of all households were made up of individuals, and 13.5% had someone living alone who was 65 years of age or older. The average household size was 2.58 and the average family size was 3.11.

In the town, the population was spread out, with 31.8% under the age of 18, 5.3% from 18 to 24, 27.3% from 25 to 44, 22.3% from 45 to 64, and 13.5% who were 65 years of age or older. The median age was 34 years. For every 100 females, there were 99.0 males. For every 100 females age 18 and over, there were 90.9 males.

The median income for a household in the town was $18,594, and the median income for a family was $20,625. Males had a median income of $23,000 versus $19,444 for females. The per capita income for the town was $10,662. About 46.1% of families and 47.5% of the population were below the poverty line, including 69.3% of those under age 18 and 52.9% of those age 65 or over.

== Notable residents ==
- Carl Elliott, the representative of Alabama's 7th congressional district, graduated in 1929 from Vina High School.
- Johnny Mack Morrow, who served in the Alabama Legislature from 1990 to 2018 was born in Vina.
