= Detroit, Alabama =

- Town
- Location of Detroit in Lamar County, Alabama.
- Coordinates: 34°01′39″N 88°10′04″W
- Country: United States
- State: Alabama
- County: Lamar

Area
  - Total: 1.32 sq mi (3.43 km^{2})
  - Land: 1.32 sq mi (3.43 km^{2})
  - Water: 0 sq mi (0.00 km^{2})
- Elevation: 413 ft (126 m)

Population (2020)
  - Total: 230
  - Density: 173.4/sq mi (66.96/km^{2})
- Time zone: UTC-6 (Central (CST))
  - Summer (DST): UTC-5 (CDT)
- ZIP code: 35552
- Area codes: 205, 659
- FIPS code: 01-20392
- GNIS feature ID: 2406377

Detroit is a town in Lamar County, Alabama, United States. It was incorporated in 1955. As of the 2020 census, Detroit had a population of 230. The prior name of the town was Millville due to the many mills built in the late 1800s.

== Geography ==
According to the U.S. Census Bureau, the town has a total area of 1.4 square miles (3.6 km^{2}), all land.

== Demographics ==
Historical population
Census	Pop.	Note	%±
1960	113		—
1970	191		69.0%
1980	326		70.7%
1990	291		−10.7%
2000	247		−15.1%
2010	237		−4.0%
2020	230		−3.0%
U.S. Decennial Census; 2013 Estimate

As of the census of 2000, there were 247 people, 102 households, and 78 families residing in the town. The population density was 182.3 inhabitants per square mile (70.4/km^{2}). There were 125 housing units at an average density of 92.3 per square mile (35.6/km^{2}). The racial makeup of the town was 79.35% White and 20.65% Black or African American.

There were 102 households, out of which 40.2% had children under the age of 18 living with them, 52.9% were married couples living together, 21.6% had a female householder with no husband present, and 23.5% were non-families. 23.5% of all households were made up of individuals, and 12.7% had someone living alone who was 65 years of age or older. The average household size was 2.42 and the average family size was 2.85.

In the town, the population was spread out, with 30.0% under the age of 18, 6.1% from 18 to 24, 30.4% from 25 to 44, 20.6% from 45 to 64, and 13.0% who were 65 years of age or older. The median age was 35 years. For every 100 females, there were 85.7 males. For every 100 females age 18 and over, there were 71.3 males.

The median income for a household in the town was $19,531, and the median income for a family was $29,750. Males had a median income of $24,643 versus $20,000 for females. The per capita income for the town was $10,107. About 30.2% of families and 23.9% of the population were below the poverty line, including 28.6% of those under the age of eighteen and 13.5% of those 65 or over.
