= Russellville, Alabama =

City in Alabama, United States

Russellville
- City
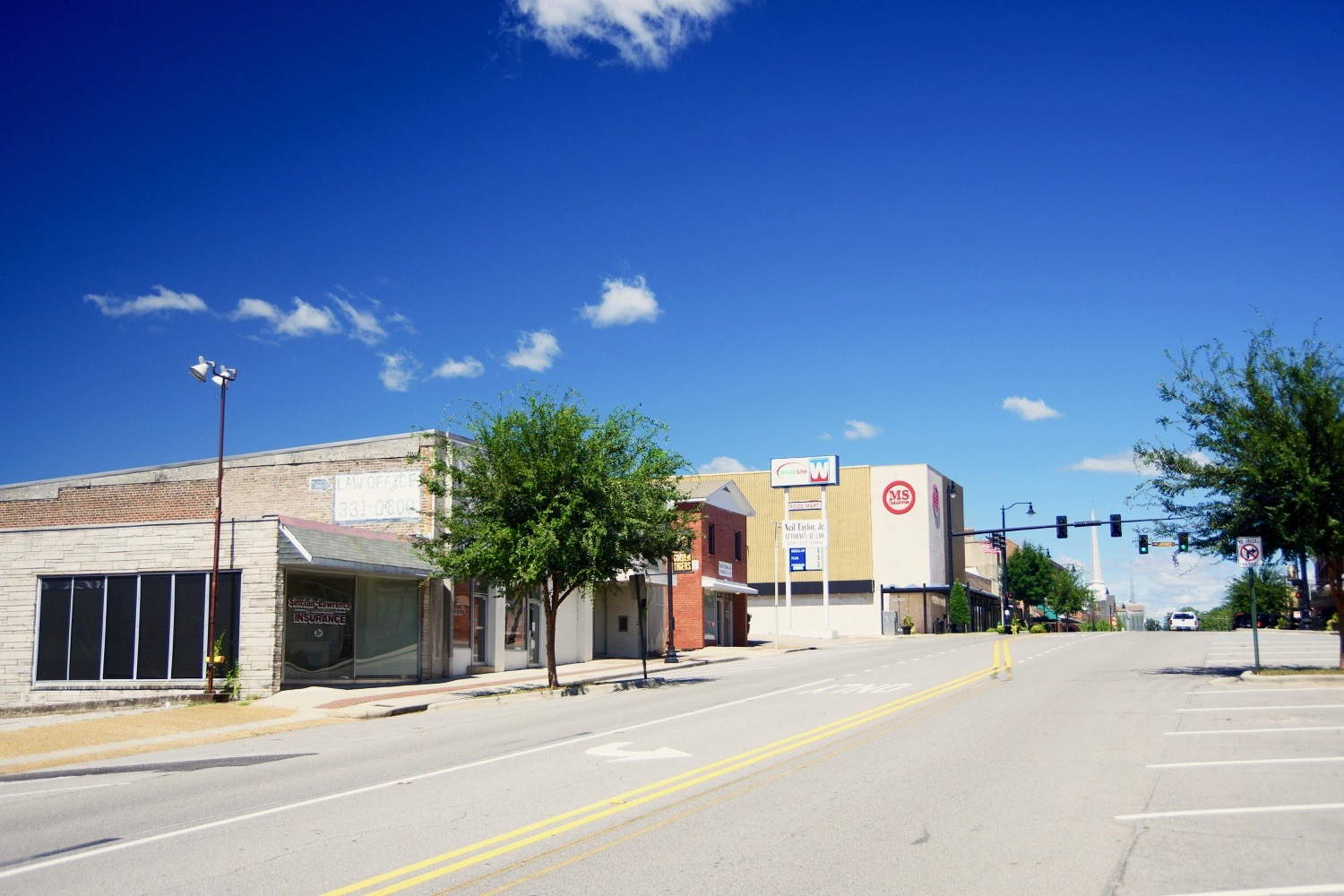
- Jackson Avenue

- Location of Russellville in Franklin County, Alabama.
- Coordinates: 34°30′02″N 87°44′25″W
- Country: United States
- State: Alabama
- County: Franklin
- Incorporated: November 27, 1819
- Named for: Major William Russell

Government
  - Type: Municipality
  - City Council: David Palmer; Darren Woodruff; Gary Cummings; Dexter Hamilton; Jamie Harris

Area
  - Total: 13.51 sq mi (35.00 km^{2})
  - Land: 13.41 sq mi (34.73 km^{2})
  - Water: 0.10 sq mi (0.27 km^{2})
- Elevation: 751 ft (229 m)

Population (2020)
  - Total: 10,855
  - Density: 809.5/sq mi (312.55/km^{2})
- Time zone: UTC-6 (Central (CST))
  - Summer (DST): UTC-5 (CDT)
- ZIP codes: 35653-35654
- Area code: 256
- FIPS code: 01-67056
- GNIS feature ID: 2404657
- Website: www.russellvilleal.org

Russellville is a city in Franklin County in the U.S. state of Alabama. At the 2020 census, the population of the city was 10,855, up from 9,830 at the 2010 census. The city is the county seat of Franklin County.

== History ==
After the War of 1812, the U.S. government appropriated money to improve a route from Nashville to New Orleans. It was named Jackson's Military Road after Andrew Jackson, and it passed through what became Russellville. (Present-day Jackson Avenue and Jackson Highway, U.S. Route 43, follow portions of the original road.)

Russellville is named after Major William Russell, an early settler in the area who helped in the construction of Jackson's Military Road. The town grew at this road's intersection with the Gaines Trace.

Russellville was incorporated on November 27, 1819.

Russellville served as the first county seat from 1818-1849 before it was removed to Frankfort (which served from 1849-1879). After the fire at the courthouse in the third county seat of Belgreen in 1890, the seat was returned to Russellville in 1891.

== Geography ==
Russellville is located in northwestern Franklin County. U.S. Route 43 passes through the eastern side of the city, leading north 18 miles (29 km) to Muscle Shoals on the Tennessee River and southwest 31 miles (50 km) to Hamilton. Alabama State Route 24 passes through the south side of the city, leading east 47 miles (76 km) to Decatur on the Tennessee River and west 26 miles (42 km) to Red Bay at the Mississippi border.

According to the U.S. Census Bureau, Russellville has a total area of 13.5 square miles (35.0 km^{2}), of which 13.4 square miles (34.7 km^{2}) is land and 0.1 square miles (0.3 km^{2}), or 0.79%, is water.

=== Climate ===
Climate data for Russellville, Alabama, 1991–2020 normals, extremes 1953–present
Month	Jan	Feb	Mar	Apr	May	Jun	Jul	Aug	Sep	Oct	Nov	Dec	Year
Record high °F (°C)	78 (26)	84 (29)	87 (31)	92 (33)	95 (35)	106 (41)	103 (39)	106 (41)	102 (39)	98 (37)	86 (30)	85 (29)	106 (41)
Mean maximum °F (°C)	68.5 (20.3)	73.6 (23.1)	80.6 (27.0)	85.6 (29.8)	89.8 (32.1)	94.4 (34.7)	96.3 (35.7)	96.9 (36.1)	93.6 (34.2)	86.5 (30.3)	78.2 (25.7)	70.0 (21.1)	97.9 (36.6)
Mean daily maximum °F (°C)	51.1 (10.6)	55.9 (13.3)	64.7 (18.2)	73.2 (22.9)	80.9 (27.2)	88.0 (31.1)	90.9 (32.7)	90.5 (32.5)	85.4 (29.7)	74.8 (23.8)	63.0 (17.2)	54.0 (12.2)	72.7 (22.6)
Daily mean °F (°C)	41.4 (5.2)	45.0 (7.2)	52.5 (11.4)	60.9 (16.1)	69.2 (20.7)	76.8 (24.9)	80.3 (26.8)	79.6 (26.4)	73.6 (23.1)	62.4 (16.9)	51.4 (10.8)	44.1 (6.7)	61.4 (16.3)
Mean daily minimum °F (°C)	31.7 (−0.2)	34.2 (1.2)	40.3 (4.6)	48.6 (9.2)	57.5 (14.2)	65.7 (18.7)	69.8 (21.0)	68.8 (20.4)	61.8 (16.6)	50.1 (10.1)	39.8 (4.3)	34.3 (1.3)	50.2 (10.1)
Mean minimum °F (°C)	12.6 (−10.8)	17.3 (−8.2)	23.1 (−4.9)	31.6 (−0.2)	41.5 (5.3)	53.8 (12.1)	61.2 (16.2)	59.2 (15.1)	47.3 (8.5)	33.3 (0.7)	24.0 (−4.4)	18.7 (−7.4)	10.4 (−12.0)
Record low °F (°C)	−24 (−31)	−12 (−24)	5 (−15)	22 (−6)	31 (−1)	36 (2)	45 (7)	46 (8)	30 (−1)	19 (−7)	10 (−12)	−7 (−22)	−24 (−31)
Average precipitation inches (mm)	5.00 (127)	5.08 (129)	5.43 (138)	5.12 (130)	5.38 (137)	3.82 (97)	4.48 (114)	4.66 (118)	3.99 (101)	3.76 (96)	4.54 (115)	5.44 (138)	56.7 (1,440)
Average snowfall inches (cm)	0.3 (0.76)	0.2 (0.51)	0.1 (0.25)	0.0 (0.0)	0.0 (0.0)	0.0 (0.0)	0.0 (0.0)	0.0 (0.0)	0.0 (0.0)	0.0 (0.0)	0.0 (0.0)	0.0 (0.0)	0.6 (1.52)
Average precipitation days (≥ 0.01 in)	9.2	8.8	9.0	8.0	8.3	8.1	8.7	7.3	6.0	6.3	7.7	8.7	96.1
Average snowy days (≥ 0.1 in)	0.2	0.2	0.0	0.0	0.0	0.0	0.0	0.0	0.0	0.0	0.0	0.2	0.6
Source 1: NOAA
Source 2: National Weather Service

== Demographics ==
Historical population
Census	Pop.	Note	%±
1870	180		—
1880	186		3.3%
1890	920		394.6%
1900	1,602		74.1%
1910	2,046		27.7%
1920	2,269		10.9%
1930	3,146		38.7%
1940	3,510		11.6%
1950	6,012		71.3%
1960	6,628		10.2%
1970	7,814		17.9%
1980	8,195		4.9%
1990	7,812		−4.7%
2000	8,971		14.8%
2010	9,830		9.6%
2020	10,855		10.4%
U.S. Decennial Census

=== 2020 census ===
Russellville racial composition
Race	Num.	Perc.
White (non-Hispanic)	5,515	50.81%
Black or African American (non-Hispanic)	870	8.01%
Native American	42	0.39%
Asian	29	0.27%
Other/Mixed	285	2.63%
Hispanic or Latino	4,114	37.9%

As of the 2020 census, Russellville had a population of 10,855. The median age was 34.1 years. 29.1% of residents were under the age of 18 and 15.3% were 65 years of age or older. For every 100 females, there were 95.4 males, and for every 100 females age 18 and over, there were 91.4 males.

85.1% of residents lived in urban areas, while 14.9% lived in rural areas.

There were 3,813 households, including 2,244 families. Of all households, 39.1% had children under the age of 18 living in them. Married-couple households made up 44.1% of households, while 18.9% had a male householder with no spouse or partner present and 31.9% had a female householder with no spouse or partner present. About 27.9% of all households were made up of individuals, and 13.3% had someone living alone who was 65 years of age or older.

There were 4,190 housing units, of which 9.0% were vacant. The homeowner vacancy rate was 2.2% and the rental vacancy rate was 7.5%.

=== 2010 census ===
At the 2010 census, there were 9,830 people and 3,556 households. The population density was 677.9 inhabitants per square mile (261.7/km^{2}). There were 3,882 housing units at an average density of 293.3 per square mile (113.2/km^{2}). The racial makeup of the city was 73.68% White, 11.25% Black or African American, 0.35% Native American, 0.12% Asian, 0.27% Pacific Islander, 7.54% from other races, and 1.17% from two or more races. 12.64% of the population were Hispanic or Latino of any race.

There were 3,556 households, of which 30.6% had children under the age of 18 living with them, 50.9% were married couples living together, 12.6% had a female householder with no husband present, and 33.5% were non-families. 30.8% of all households were made up of individuals, and 16.0% had someone living alone who was 65 years of age or older. The average household size was 2.44 and the average family size was 3.03.

Age distribution was 24.2% under the age of 18, 9.8% from 18 to 24, 26.5% from 25 to 44, 21.6% from 45 to 64, and 17.9% who were 65 years of age or older. The median age was 37 years. For every 100 females, there are 89.6 males. For every 100 females age 18 and over, there were 85.3 males.

The median household income was $25,333, and the median family income was $35,799. Males had a median income of $27,238 versus $18,551 for females. The per capita income for the city was $14,871. About 16.7% of families and 22.2% of the population were below the poverty line, including 29.2% of those under age 18 and 24.9% of those age 65 or over.

== Local features ==
Watermelon Festival - The annual "Watermelon Festival" is held each August in downtown Russellville, and includes music and entertainment, car and tractor shows, and arts and crafts.

Roxy Theater - Built in 1949, the theater originally served primarily as a movie cinema, but saw a major decline in the early 1980s. It now has been revitalized as an entertainment venue due to the efforts of The Franklin County Arts and Humanities Council and the support of local citizens.

King Drive-In - (Now closed as of 2024) The King Drive-In is located just north of Russellville on Highway 43. One of the few drive-in movie theaters still operating in Alabama, it plays currently released films throughout the spring and summer on Friday, Saturday and Sunday nights. The theater features old-style speakers that hang on car windows, but also offers the soundtrack of films through FM radio broadcasts, as well.

The Strip - From the 1960s until approximately 2000, "The Downtown Strip" had been a source of entertainment for local teenagers throughout Franklin County. This strip is best described as having the atmosphere of George Lucas' iconic film, American Graffiti. Cruising the strip ended near the end of 2004 due to an increased local police presence in the area.

RHS stadium - Russellville High School Stadium is a place where local residents watch the high school football team play. Russellville's football team ranks as one of the most successful teams in Alabama in terms of all-time playoff wins.

== Local media ==
WMTY-TV features area events about the Russellville area including news and weather, though most programming is religious. Its translator station is W46DF-D. Radio stations include WKAX AM 1500, WGOL AM 920, and WPMR-LP 99.7 FM. Russellville's newspapers are The Franklin Free Press] and the Franklin County Times.

== Transportation ==
There is no fixed-route transit service in Russellville. However, the Northwest Alabama Council of Local Governments operates a dial-a-ride transit service known as NACOLG Transit.

== Notable people ==
- Kandi Barbour (born Kandie Lou Dotson), XRCO and AVN Hall of Fame adult film star
- Lee Clayton, rock and country musician and composer
- Luther Duncan, director of the Alabama Extension Service and president of the Alabama Polytechnic Institute.
- Althea Brown Edmiston, Presbyterian missionary in the Belgian Congo
- Junius Foy Guin Jr., federal judge
- Gustav Hasford, writer whose novel was the basis of the film Full Metal Jacket
- Joey Manley, webcomic publisher and author
- Sonequa Martin-Green, television actress
- Bryson Mitchell, racing driver
- Madeline Mitchell, Miss Alabama USA 2011
- Chucky Mullins, collegiate football player
- T. Ray Richeson, football player and head coach of Livingston State College
- Thomas William Sadler, U.S. congressman from 1885 to 1887.
- Arron Sears, professional football player

== See also ==
- Russellville City Schools
