= Tremont, Mississippi =

- Town
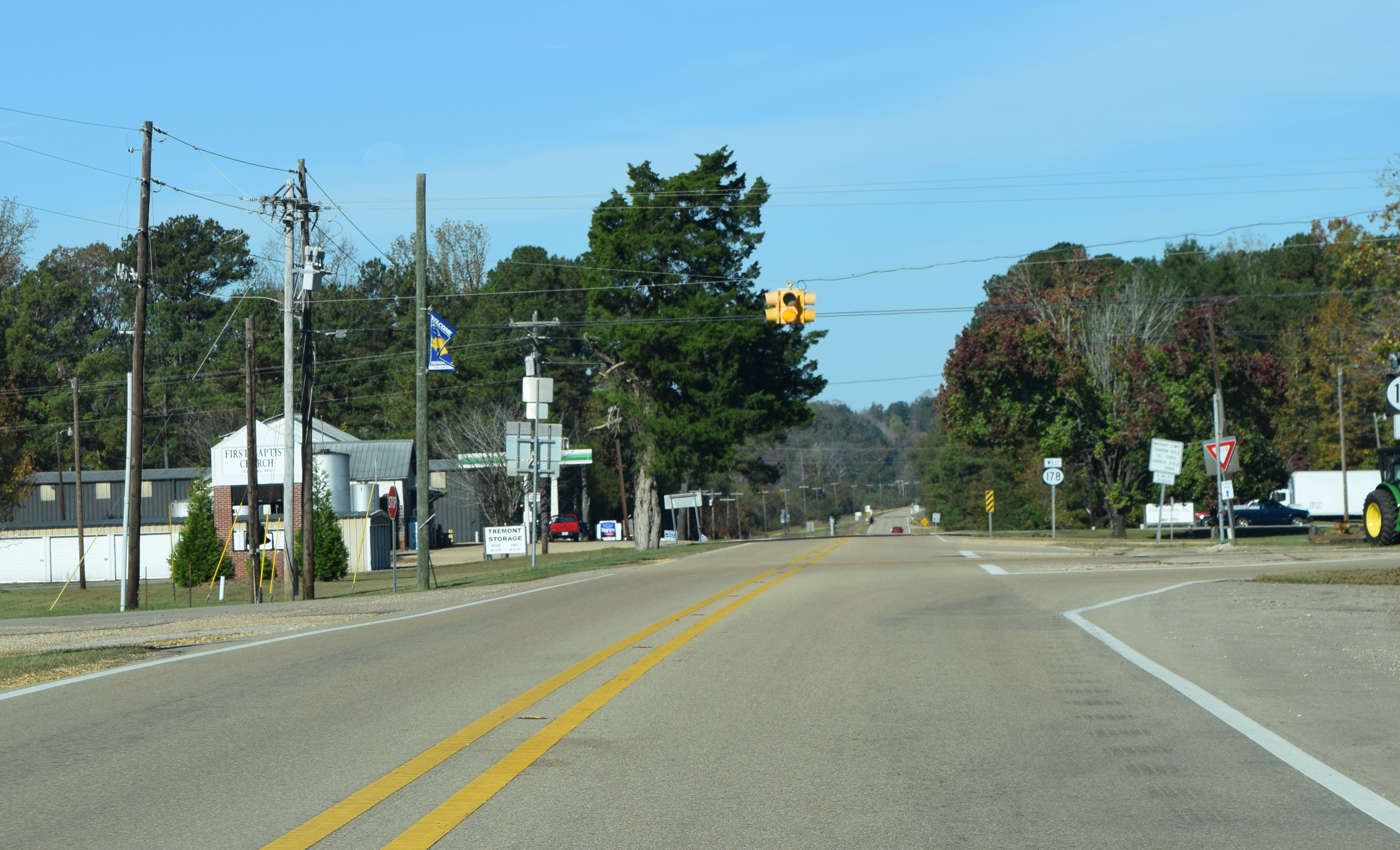
- Looking west on Mississippi Highway 178 at its intersection with Mississippi Highway 23 in Tremont

- Location of Tremont, Mississippi

- Location in the United States
- Coordinates: 34°14′23″N 88°15′02″W
- Country: United States
- State: Mississippi
- County: Itawamba

Area
  - Total: 4.92 sq mi (12.74 km^{2})
  - Land: 4.91 sq mi (12.71 km^{2})
  - Water: 0.015 sq mi (0.04 km^{2})
- Elevation: 338 ft (103 m)

Population (2020)
  - Total: 467
  - Density: 95.2/sq mi (36.75/km^{2})
- Time zone: UTC-6 (Central (CST))
  - Summer (DST): UTC-5 (CDT)
- ZIP code: 38876
- Area code: 662
- FIPS code: 28-74400
- GNIS feature ID: 2406748
- Website: tremont.itawambams.com

Tremont is a town in Itawamba County, Mississippi, United States. It was founded in 1852. As of the 2020 census, Tremont had a population of 467.

== Geography ==
Tremont is in eastern Itawamba County, to the east of Bull Mountain Creek, part of the Tombigbee River watershed. Interstate 22/U.S. Route 78 passes through the southern end of the town, with access from Exit 113. I-22/US-78 leads west 28 miles (45 km) to Tupelo and east 68 miles (109 km) to Jasper, Alabama. Mississippi Highway 178, following the former alignment of US-78, runs through the center of Tremont, leading west 9 miles (14 km) to Fulton, the Itawamba County seat. Mississippi Highway 23 passes through the center of Tremont, leading southwest 16 miles (26 km) to Smithville and northeast 17 miles (27 km) to Red Bay, Alabama.

According to the United States Census Bureau, Tremont has a total area of 4.9 square miles (12.7 km^{2}), of which 0.02 square miles (0.04 km^{2}), or 0.30%, are water.

== Demographics ==
Historical population
Census	Pop.	Note	%±
1980	379		—
1990	342		−9.8%
2000	390		14.0%
2010	465		19.2%
2020	467		0.4%
U.S. Decennial Census

As of the census of 2000, there were 390 people, 153 households, and 111 families residing in the town. The population density was 78.9 inhabitants per square mile (30.5/km^{2}). There were 178 housing units at an average density of 36.0 per square mile (13.9/km^{2}). The racial makeup of the town was 96.15% White, 1.54% African American, 0.26% Asian, 1.03% from other races, and 1.03% from two or more races. Hispanic or Latino of any race were 1.28% of the population.

There were 153 households, out of which 35.3% had children under the age of 18 living with them, 58.8% were married couples living together, 7.8% had a female householder with no husband present, and 26.8% were non-families. 24.8% of all households were made up of individuals, and 10.5% had someone living alone who was 65 years of age or older. The average household size was 2.55 and the average family size was 3.04.

In the town, the population was spread out, with 25.1% under the age of 18, 10.5% from 18 to 24, 28.5% from 25 to 44, 23.8% from 45 to 64, and 12.1% who were 65 years of age or older. The median age was 34 years. For every 100 females, there were 101.0 males. For every 100 females age 18 and over, there were 101.4 males.

The median income for a household in the town was $27,143, and the median income for a family was $35,341. Males had a median income of $31,042 versus $21,250 for females. The per capita income for the town was $13,348. About 14.3% of families and 16.4% of the population were below the poverty line, including 18.3% of those under age 18 and 19.7% of those age 65 or over.

== Education ==
Tremont is served by the Itawamba County School District.

== Notable people ==
- Sharion Aycock, Judge of the United States District Court for the Northern District of Mississippi
- Randy Boyd, member of the Mississippi House of Representatives
- Donald G. Jackson, filmmaker
- Charles Sallis, historian and writer
- Tammy Wynette, country music singer
