= Red Bay, Alabama =

City in Alabama, United States

Red Bay
- City
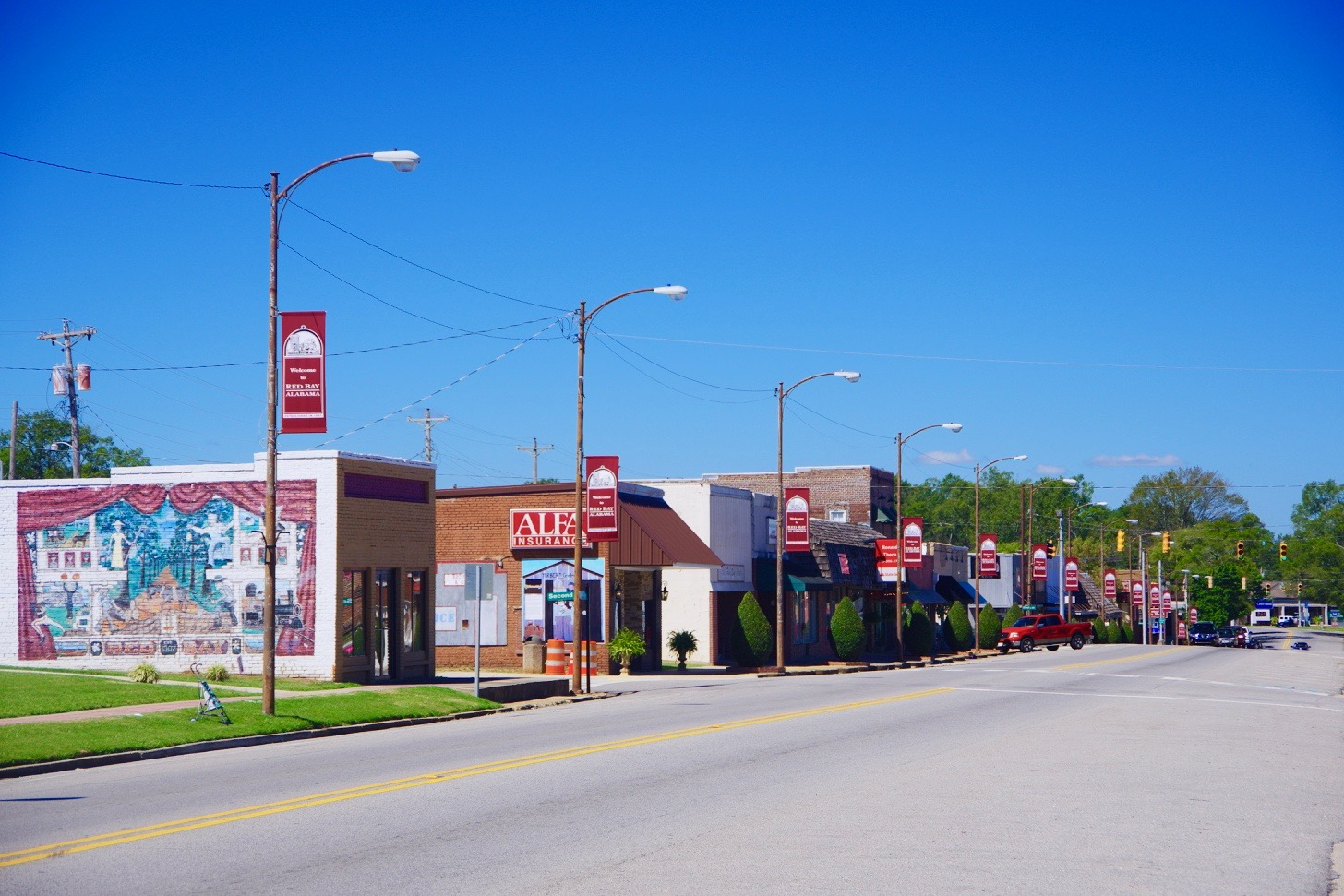
- Fourth Avenue

- Flag
- Motto: "A friendly city on a progressive path"
- Location of Red Bay in Franklin County, Alabama.
- Coordinates: 34°26′02″N 88°07′48″W
- Country: United States
- State: Alabama
- County: Franklin
- Established: 1907

Government
  - Type: Municipality

Area
  - Total: 9.84 sq mi (25.49 km^{2})
  - Land: 9.75 sq mi (25.26 km^{2})
  - Water: 0.093 sq mi (0.24 km^{2})
- Elevation: 669 ft (204 m)

Population (2020)
  - Total: 3,232
  - Density: 331.4/sq mi (127.97/km^{2})
- Time zone: UTC-6 (Central (CST))
  - Summer (DST): UTC-5 (CDT)
- Zip Code: 35582
- Area code: 256
- FIPS code: 01-63576
- GNIS feature ID: 2404601
- Website: www.cityofredbay.org/crb/

Red Bay is a city in Franklin County, Alabama, United States. It was founded in 1907; its western boundary line is integral with the state line between Mississippi and Alabama. The population was 3,232 at the 2020 census.

The town's name comes from the area's red clay soil and the many redbay trees (Persea borbonia) in this area of north Alabama.

== History ==
What is now Red Bay was originally known as "Vinson's Crossroads," and was initially located further to the southwest along Gum Creek. A branch of the Illinois Central Railroad was constructed through the area in 1907, and Red Bay developed into an important lumber and shipping center. The city incorporated during this same period.

=== Oak trees ===
One of the city's most well known and admired features are the redbay trees. The trees, planted by the Red Bay Garden Club in the 1930s, cast a canopy over Main Street.

=== Red Bay High School ===
The first school in Red Bay was located where the First United Methodist Church stands today. In 1903, this school had one faculty member who was responsible for teaching, as well as most of the custodial duties. After crops were harvested, students attended school through the remainder of the fall and winter months until the spring planting season.

The second school was constructed in the early 1900s. It was located on the site that is now the location of the Red Bay City Park. It was a small building with few amenities. The school continued dismissals timed with the local harvests.

In 1927, a new school site was selected, and a new school built for $45,000. Since this construction, the location of the school has not changed. The building constructed in 1927 was a brick "U", one of the most popular school designs in Alabama at the time. Facing the school, the right wing of the "U" housed the elementary classes while the left wing held the high school. Once inside the school, after going under the stone entryway, the office of the principal was on your immediate left. A small room on the right served as the library. A large auditorium with double wooden seats that could be folded and stored was centrally located between the two wings. The building housing the home economics and agriculture departments was located on the left of the main school building. At a later date, classrooms were added to the left wing of the main building. Due to the slope of the site, a ground-level lunchroom was included in this addition. With steps leading from the hallway, the first cafeteria available to Red Bay students became operational.

Due to increased enrollment, a new high school section was completed in 1962. In 1967, the auditorium and elementary wing of the 1927 building was destroyed by fire. The disaster occurred while school was in session, but no injuries occurred. Plans began immediately to rebuild the school. A new auditorium and elementary classroom section first welcomed students during the 1968–69 school year.

In 1976, Red Bay celebrated both the nation's bicentennial and the opening of a new gymnasium. Eight years later, in 1984, a new cafeteria was ready for use in time for the school's annual football banquet. The former cafeteria was renovated providing five additional classrooms, a photography lab, and a yearbook staff workroom.

==== School athletics ====
Football games were first played in a pasture where the present Sunshine Homes plant is located. Later, the games were played at the American Legion Field which is the current location of Tiffin Motor Homes. Red Bay finished runner-up in football in 1974 and 1976. Following the 1976 runner-up game, there was a scandal involving Red Bay football team and coaches on alcohol abuse before the game. The football teams in the following seasons struggled to win a game, until the 1986-87 team which won the first game in years. There were players who, prior to this time, granted scholarships at Alabama and Auburn. One notable player was Van Tiffin, who went on to the University of Alabama and made his mark there by kicking a 52-yard game-winning field goal against Alabama's arch rival Auburn that is now known in Alabama's hall of fame as "The Kick." The Red Bay football teams reached state semifinals in 1990, 1997, and 2007.

Red Bay girls basketball has five state championships. Red Bay boys basketball made the final eight teams in 1995 with a 26–5 record. Red Bay's highest finish in tennis was 2008, in fifth place. Red Bay baseball was class 2A State runner-up in 1987.

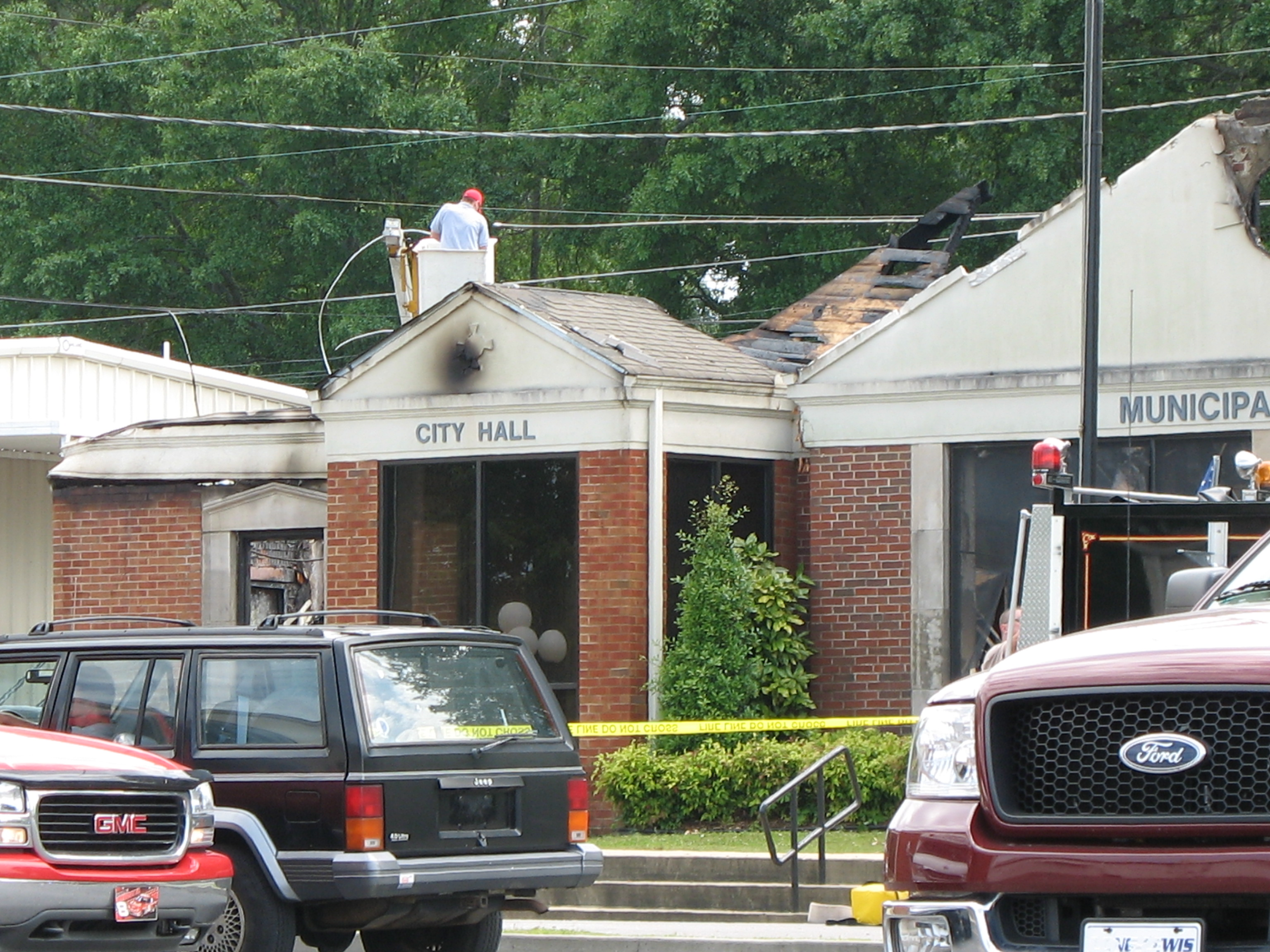
City Hall After Fire

=== City Hall fire ===
In the summer of 2006, the Red Bay City Hall caught fire after a transformer exploded. Construction on a new city hall building began shortly afterward. The contractor bid for the new city hall by Burton Construction of Belmont, Mississippi, was supposedly $750,000. Bids were also set for a new police department building with the lowest bid being placed at $500,000.

== Geography ==
Red Bay is located in western Franklin County. The western border of the city is the Mississippi state line. It is situated on the Tennessee Valley Divide, with the northern half of the city draining north to Bear Creek, a tributary of the Tennessee River, and the southern half draining south to Gum Creek, a tributary of the Tombigbee River.

Alabama State Route 24 is a four-lane highway that passes south of the city center, leading east 25 miles (40 km) to Russellville and west 2 miles (3 km) to the Mississippi line. Tremont, Mississippi, is 18 miles (29 km) to the southwest.

According to the U.S. Census Bureau, the city has a total area of 9.8 square miles (25.5 km^{2}), of which 9.7 square miles (25.2 km^{2}) is land and 0.1 square miles (0.3 km^{2}), or 1.01%, is water.

=== Climate ===
Climate is characterized by relatively high temperatures and evenly distributed precipitation throughout the year. The Köppen Climate Classification subtype for this climate is "Cfa" (Humid Subtropical Climate).

Climate data for Red Bay, Alabama
Month	Jan	Feb	Mar	Apr	May	Jun	Jul	Aug	Sep	Oct	Nov	Dec	Year
Mean daily maximum °C (°F)	9 (49)	12 (54)	17 (63)	24 (75)	27 (81)	31 (87)	32 (90)	32 (90)	29 (84)	24 (75)	18 (64)	12 (54)	22 (72)
Mean daily minimum °C (°F)	−2 (29)	−1 (31)	4 (40)	10 (50)	14 (58)	18 (65)	20 (68)	19 (67)	17 (62)	10 (50)	5 (41)	1 (33)	9 (49)
Average precipitation mm (inches)	160 (6.2)	130 (5.1)	170 (6.8)	140 (5.5)	120 (4.9)	86 (3.4)	110 (4.2)	89 (3.5)	89 (3.5)	74 (2.9)	110 (4.2)	150 (6.1)	1,440 (56.5)
Average precipitation days	11	9	10	8	8	7	9	7	7	5	7	9	97
Source: Weatherbase

== Demographics ==
Historical population
Census	Pop.	Note	%±
1910	472		—
1920	753		59.5%
1930	1,297		72.2%
1940	1,560		20.3%
1950	1,805		15.7%
1960	1,954		8.3%
1970	2,464		26.1%
1980	3,232		31.2%
1990	3,451		6.8%
2000	3,374		−2.2%
2010	3,158		−6.4%
2020	3,232		2.3%
U.S. Decennial Census; 2013 Estimate

=== 1990 census ===
As of the census of 1990 the racial makeup of the city was 95.06% White, 3.25% Black or African American, 0.25% Native American, 0.62% from other races, and 0.91% from two or more races. 0.9% of the population were Hispanic or Latino of any race.

=== 2020 census ===
As of the 2020 census, Red Bay had a population of 3,232. The median age was 42.7 years. 22.5% of residents were under the age of 18 and 22.5% of residents were 65 years of age or older. For every 100 females there were 83.8 males, and for every 100 females age 18 and over there were 78.9 males age 18 and over.

As of the 2020 census, there were 1,220 households and 640 families residing in the city.

0.0% of residents lived in urban areas, while 100.0% lived in rural areas.

Of households in Red Bay, 30.1% had children under the age of 18 living in them. Of all households, 41.6% were married-couple households, 16.3% were households with a male householder and no spouse or partner present, and 36.4% were households with a female householder and no spouse or partner present. About 33.5% of all households were made up of individuals and 15.8% had someone living alone who was 65 years of age or older.

There were 1,531 housing units, of which 11.6% were vacant. The homeowner vacancy rate was 1.4% and the rental vacancy rate was 8.9%.

Red Bay racial composition
Race	Num.	Perc.
White (non-Hispanic)	2,874	88.92%
Black or African American (non-Hispanic)	32	0.99%
Native American	23	0.71%
Asian	8	0.25%
Pacific Islander	2	0.06%
Other/Mixed	116	3.59%
Hispanic or Latino	177	5.48%

=== 2010 census ===
As of the census of 2010, there were 3,158 people, 1,362 households, and 898 families residing in the town. The population density was 322.2 inhabitants per square mile (124.4/km^{2}). There were 1,508 housing units at an average density of 153.9 per square mile (59.4/km^{2}). The racial makeup of the town was 92.5% White, 1.2% African American, 0.3% Native American, 3.9% from other races, and 1.9% from two or more races. 5.1% of the population were Hispanic or Latino of any race.

There were 1,362 households, out of which 25.8% had children under the age of 18 living with them, 46.8% were married couples living together, 14.6% had a female householder with no husband present, and 34.1% were non-families. 31.4% of all households were made up of individuals, and 15.0% had someone living alone who was 65 years of age or older. The average household size was 2.32 and the average family size was 2.87.

In the town the population was spread out, with 26.2% under the age of 18, 5.9% from 18 to 24, 24.8% from 25 to 44, 24.8% from 45 to 64, and 18.3% who were 65 years of age or older. The median age was 40 years. For every 100 females, there were 89.3 males. For every 100 females age 18 and over, there were 86.9 males.

The median income for a household in the town was $27,303, and the median income for a family was $41,696. Males had a median income of $38,328 versus $24,211 for females. The per capita income for the town was $18,133. About 23.5% of families and 29.3% of the population were below the poverty line, including 47.4% of those under age 18 and 17.2% of those age 65 or over.

=== 2000 census ===
As of the census of 2000, there were 3,374 people, 1,429 households, and 987 families residing in the city. The population density was 343.7 inhabitants per square mile (132.7/km^{2}). There were 1,594 housing units at an average density of 162.4 per square mile (62.7/km^{2}). The racial makeup of the city was 96.86% White, 1.45% Black or African American, 0.21% Native American, 0.62% from other races, and 0.86% from two or more races. 0.80% of the population were Hispanic or Latino of any race.

There were 1,429 households, out of which 27.9% had children under the age of 18 living with them, 54.0% were married couples living together, 12.0% had a female householder with no husband present, and 30.9% were non-families. 29.4% of all households were made up of individuals, and 13.9% had someone living alone who was 65 years of age or older. The average household size was 2.30 and the average family size was 2.82.

In the city, the population was spread out, with 21.7% under the age of 18, 8.0% from 18 to 24, 25.2% from 25 to 44, 26.2% from 45 to 64, and 18.9% who were 65 years of age or older. The median age was 41 years. For every 100 females, there were 83.5 males. For every 100 females age 18 and over, there were 80.3 males.

The median income for a household in the city was $27,596, and the median income for a family was $32,177. Males had a median income of $28,524 versus $20,169 for females. The per capita income for the city was $14,653. About 17.7% of families and 20.9% of the population were below the poverty line, including 24.6% of those under age 18 and 20.2% of those age 65 or over.

== Notable people ==
- Lindell Cooley, pastor, singer and worship leader of the Brownsville Revival in Pensacola, Florida
- Tonya Suzanne Holly, television and film producer
- Mac McAnally, country music singer-songwriter, session musician and record producer
- Johnny Mack Morrow who served in the Alabama Legislature from 1990 to 2018 graduated from Red Bay High School.
- Eric Powell, member of the Mississippi Senate from the 4th District
- Van Tiffin, former American football placekicker; graduated from Red Bay High School
- Zadoc L. Weatherford, former congressman
- Tammy Wynette, the "First Lady of Country Music", born across the border near Tremont, Mississippi, spent time in Red Bay.
