= List of United States tornadoes from January to March 2025 =

List of tornadoes in the United States

United States tornadoes from January to March 2025
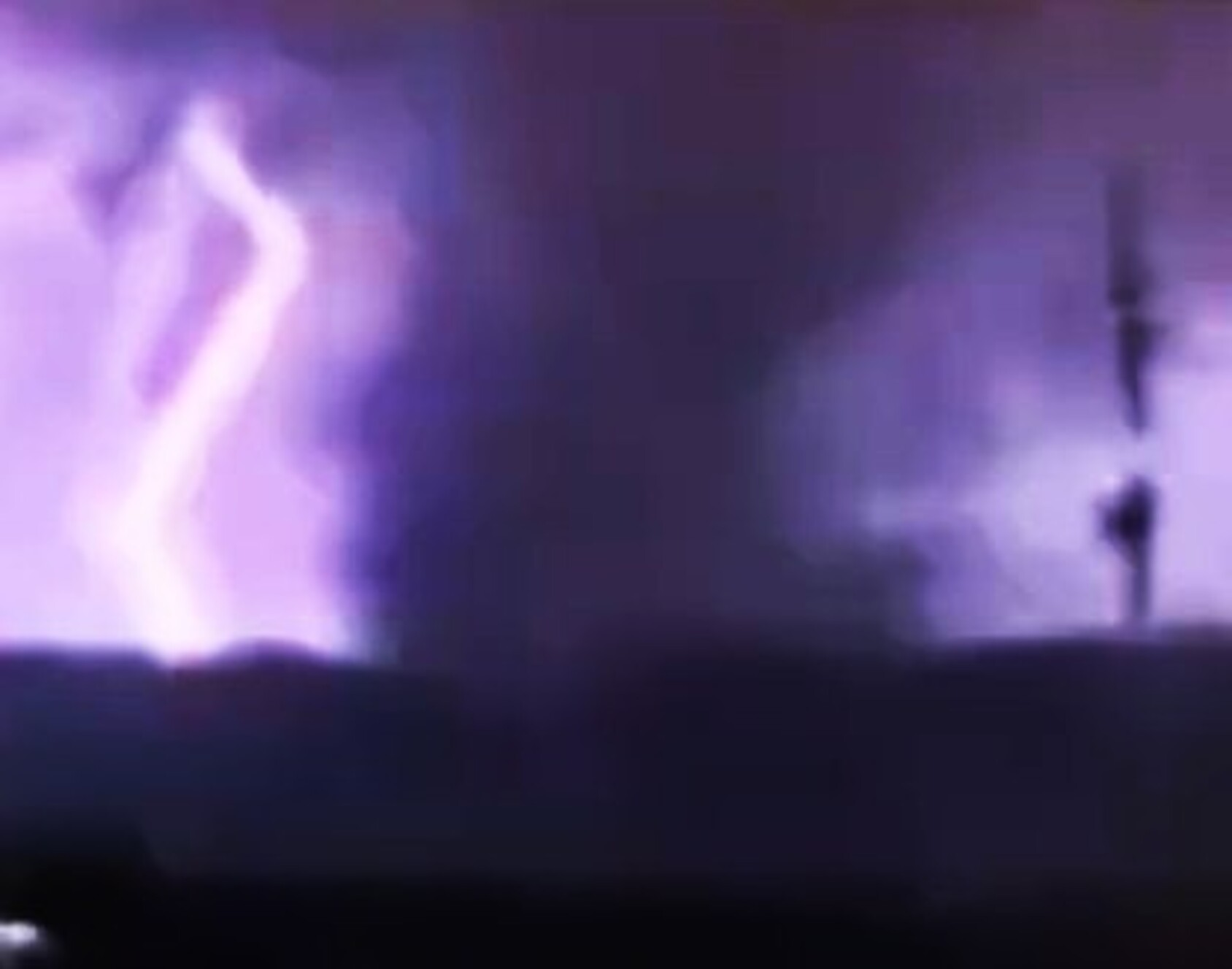
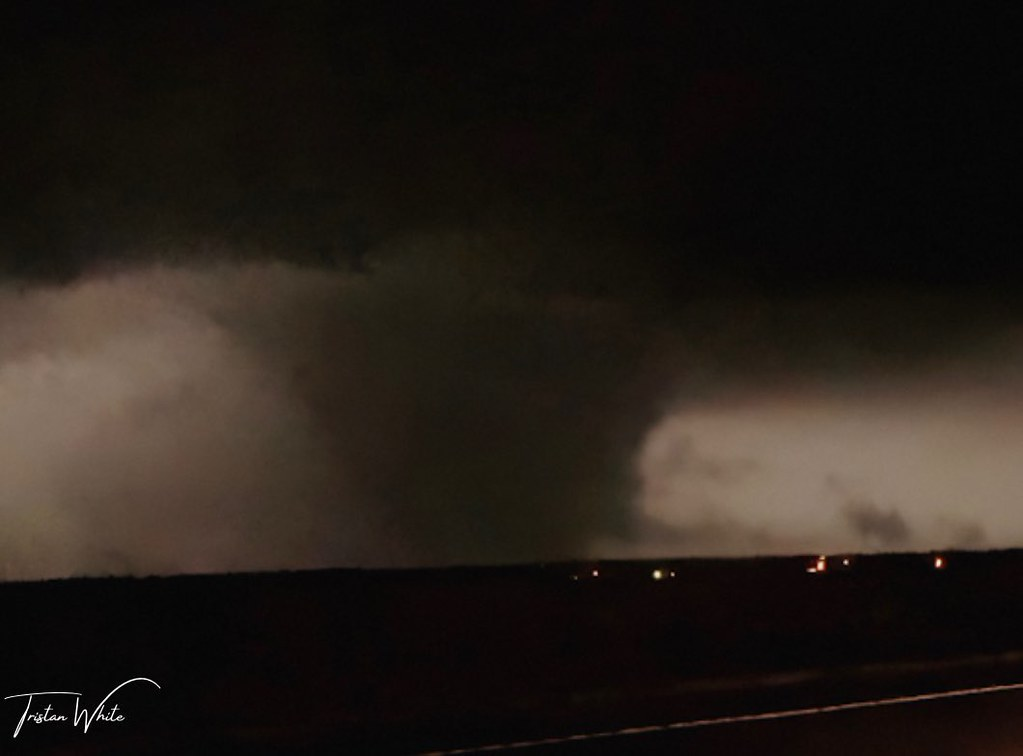
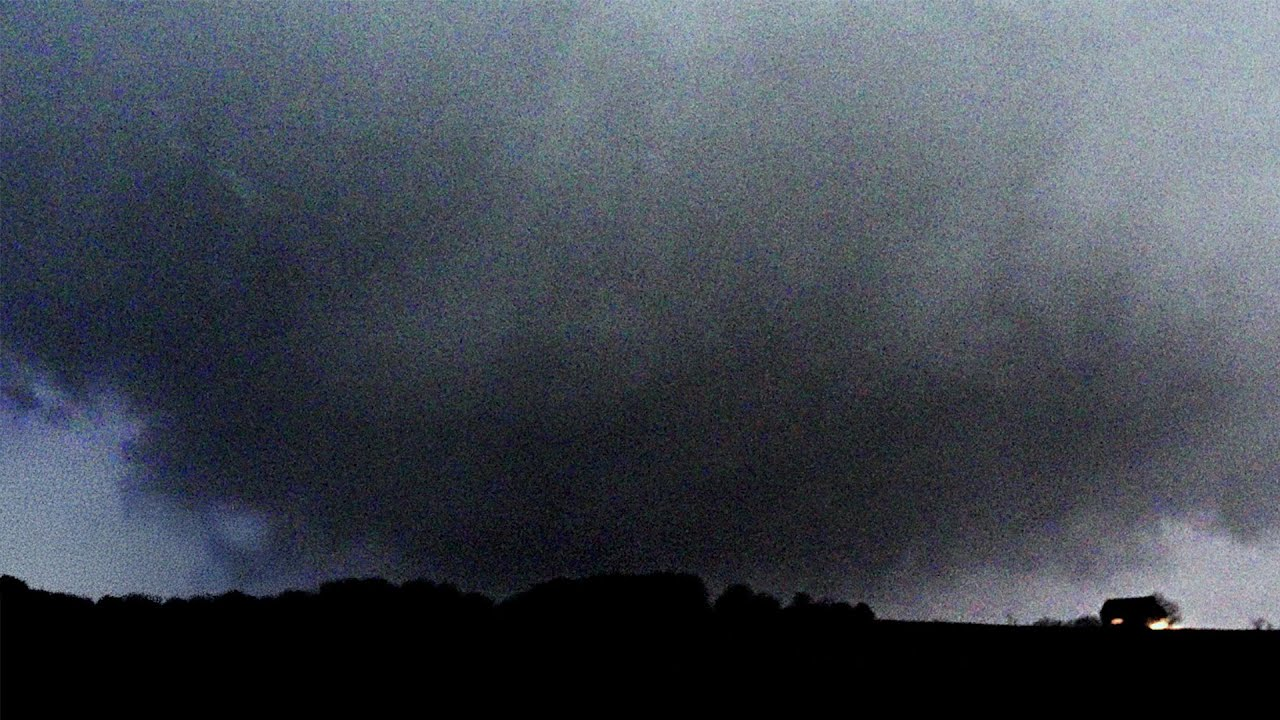
- Clockwise from top: A violent EF4 tornado near Diaz, Arkansas on March 14; a deadly EF3 tornado near Bakersfield, Missouri on March 14; A long-tracked EF4 tornado in southern Missouri on March 14
- Timespan: January 3 – March 31
- Maximum rated tornado: EF4 tornado: Fifty-Six–Larkin, Arkansas on March 14; Diaz, Arkansas on March 14; Tylertown, Mississippi on March 15
- Tornadoes: 294
- Fatalities: 26
- Injuries: ~104

This page documents all tornadoes confirmed by various weather forecast offices of the National Weather Service in the United States from January to March 2025. Tornado counts are considered preliminary until final publication in the database of the National Centers for Environmental Information. Based on the 1991–2020 average, about 39 tornadoes are typically recorded across the United States during January, about 36 tornadoes are recorded in February, and about 80 tornadoes are recorded in March. These tornadoes are commonly focused across the Southern United States due to their proximity to the unstable air mass and warm waters of the Gulf of Mexico, as well as California in association with winter storms in those three months. With the arrival of spring, activity begins to shift northward especially later in March.

After a small outbreak at the beginning of January, multiple arctic air intrusions impacted the eastern United States while California, especially the southern part of the state, did not experience many winter storms. The month finished well below average with only 16 tornadoes as a result. February saw a much more active weather pattern take shape across North America during the middle of the month, with winter storms bringing multiple rounds of severe weather outbreaks to the southern United States and producing a handful of significant tornadoes. February came out average with 39 tornadoes. A significant ramp-up in tornadic activity occurred in March, with a moderate outbreak early in the month followed by a very large, historic and deadly tornado outbreak in the middle of the month which pushed March well-above average. The outbreak also produced three EF4 tornadoes with two of them occurring in Arkansas on March 14. Moderate tornado outbreaks occurred throughout the rest of the month, which finished with 240 confirmed tornadoes, breaking the record set by March 2022 for the most active March since records began in 1950.

== January ==
Confirmed tornadoes by Enhanced Fujita rating
EFU	EF0	EF1	EF2	EF3	EF4	EF5	Total
2	3	9	2	0	0	0	16

=== January 3 event ===
List of confirmed tornadoes – Friday, January 3, 2025 (Note: All dates are based on the local time zone where the tornado touched down; however, all times are in Coordinated Universal Time for consistency.)
EF#	Location	County / parish	State	Start coord.	Time (UTC)	Path length	Max. width
EFU	NW of Dales	Tehama	CA	40.3374°N 122.0899°W	01:18–01:21	0.8 mi (1.3 km)	50 yd (46 m)
EFU	A short-lived tornado touched down over open land, causing no reported damage.						

=== January 5 event ===
List of confirmed tornadoes – Sunday, January 5, 2025
EF#	Location	County / parish	State	Start coord.	Time (UTC)	Path length	Max. width
EF1	SE of Star City	Lincoln	AR	33.8672°N 91.6875°W	20:04-20:07	1.21 mi (1.95 km)	300 yd (270 m)
EF1	This tornado began north of AR 54 and moved northeast along the highway, damaging chicken houses and causing roof damage to two homes. It continued northeast, uprooting and snapping several trees before lifting near a barn.						
EF2	SE of Marion to S of Sulphur Springs, AR	Union, Morehouse	LA	32.8646°N 92.191°W	20:19–20:37	9.03 mi (14.53 km)	650 yd (590 m)
EF2	A high-end EF2 tornado touched down southeast of Marion and moved northeast. Numerous trees were snapped or had large branches broken. A trailer was lifted from its foundation, and debris was blown across the area with extensive vehicle damage nearby. Several homes sustained roof and carport damage, and a shop collapsed and was blown off its foundation at peak intensity. Additional roof and shed damage occurred before the tornado entered the Upper Ouachita National Wildlife Refuge. High-resolution satellite imagery showed the tornado continued northeast, crossing the Ouachita River before dissipating.						
EF1	NW of Oak Grove	West Carroll	LA	32.9122°N 91.4734°W	21:42–21:44	2.17 mi (3.49 km)	100 yd (91 m)
EF1	The roofs of a few residences were damaged, a mobile was shifted off its foundation and trees were snapped.						
EF1	S of Holly Bluff	Sharkey, Yazoo	MS	32.77°N 90.74°W	23:14–23:20	6.1 mi (9.8 km)	450 yd (410 m)
EF1	A few trees were uprooted. This tornado was confirmed in March 2025 through satellite imagery.						
EF1	NW of Aberdeen	Monroe	MS	33.858°N 88.6242°W	01:08–01:09	0.69 mi (1.11 km)	120 yd (110 m)
EF1	This brief tornado uprooted or snapped trees and caused roof damage to a house. Some power lines were also downed.						
EF1	SE of Brandon to NE of Pelahatchie	Rankin	MS	32.2541°N 89.9184°W	01:11–01:28	11.12 mi (17.90 km)	150 yd (140 m)
EF1	Several chicken houses were damaged, with debris thrown into fields. Many trees were snapped or uprooted, and power lines were downed.						
EF0	W of Vina	Franklin	AL	34.3514°N 88.1414°W	01:40–01:44	2.44 mi (3.93 km)	158 yd (144 m)
EF0	A pole barn sustained major damage to its roof and supporting beams. A mobile home sustained roof damage and had one of its windows shattered. Trees were snapped or uprooted as well.						
EF1	SE of Louisville	Winston	MS	33.0885°N 88.9686°W	01:41–01:47	4.26 mi (6.86 km)	250 yd (230 m)
EF1	This high-end EF1 tornado first impacted the south side of Boon, where a metal gas station building was unroofed and had an exterior wall blown out. A tree fell onto and damaged a nearby home, while another house and a shed sustained roof damage. The tornado then continued to the northeast, snapping multiple trees and damaging another shed before it lifted just after it crossed MS 14.						
EF2	N of Brooksville	Noxubee	MS	33.2445°N 88.5887°W	02:11–02:16	3.42 mi (5.50 km)	500 yd (460 m)
EF2	A low-end EF2 tornado snapped or uprooted numerous large trees in wooded areas as it crossed US 45. Five power poles were snapped as well, and an irrigation pivot was overturned.						
EF0	NW of New Hebron	Lawrence, Simpson	MS	31.7243°N 90.0773°W	02:18–02:28	5.99 mi (9.64 km)	75 yd (69 m)
EF0	A few trees were downed, a house had minor roof damage, and a trampoline was thrown.						
EF1	NE of New Hebron	Jefferson Davis, Simpson	MS	31.7385°N 89.9324°W	02:32–02:38	4.02 mi (6.47 km)	300 yd (270 m)
EF1	This tornado passed through the rural community of Gwinville, where an old gas station building was shifted off its foundation and had its porch uplifted. A house had its porch overhang removed as well, and some trees and tree branches were downed. The tornado dissipated just over the Simpson County line near MS 13.						
EF1	NNW of Mize	Smith	MS	31.9013°N 89.6415°W	02:52–03:00	6.18 mi (9.95 km)	300 yd (270 m)
EF1	A high-end EF1 tornado damaged or destroyed multiple sheds and outbuildings, one of which had its debris and contents scattered across the ground. A house had minor gutter and exterior damage, and another house had a carport thrown into it. Many trees were snapped or uprooted, and several power poles were also snapped.						
EF1	N of Carrollton	Pickens	AL	33.2937°N 88.1714°W	02:53–03:02	6.94 mi (11.17 km)	300 yd (270 m)
EF1	Two homes had roofing removed and numerous trees were snapped or uprooted, a few of which fell onto a garage. Power lines were downed and a small power pole was snapped.						

=== January 29 event ===
List of confirmed tornadoes – Wednesday, January 29, 2025
EF#	Location	County / Parish	State	Start Coord.	Time (UTC)	Path length	Max width
EFU	Western Albuquerque	Bernalillo	NM	35.0894°N 106.745°W	21:10–21:13	0.34 mi (0.55 km)	10 yd (9.1 m)
EFU	A brief landspout tornado occurred in an open field near the western outskirts of Albuquerque. This is the first documented tornado in New Mexico in the month of January.						

=== January 31 event ===
List of confirmed tornadoes – Friday, January 31, 2025
EF#	Location	County / Parish	State	Start Coord.	Time (UTC)	Path length	Max width
EF0	ESE of Bassfield	Jefferson Davis	MS	31.4593°N 85.6596°W	09:12–09:14	0.52 mi (0.84 km)	75 yd (69 m)
EF0	Roof damage occurred, some trees were uprooted, and tree limbs were snapped as a result of this brief tornado.						

== February ==
Confirmed tornadoes by Enhanced Fujita rating
EFU	EF0	EF1	EF2	EF3	EF4	EF5	Total
1	9	23	5	1	0	0	39

=== February 6 event ===
List of confirmed tornadoes – Thursday, February 6, 2025
EF#	Location	County / Parish	State	Start Coord.	Time (UTC)	Path length	Max width
EF1	S of Magnolia	Hart	KY	37.4109°N 85.764°W	11:07–11:10	2.90 mi (4.67 km)	100 yd (91 m)
EF1	Two homes had roof shingles torn off, one of which also had windows blown out, and a large metal barn lost part of its roof and had its doors blown in. Debris from the barn was strewn up to 200 yd (180 m) away, and pieces of wood were embedded into the ground. An older barn also suffered roof damage, and pieces of sheet metal roofing were wrapped around trees and fencing. Many trees were snapped or uprooted, and some power poles were snapped as well.						
EF1	WNW of Dango	Rockcastle	KY	37.3775°N 84.1784°W	12:48–12:52	0.73 mi (1.17 km)	270 yd (250 m)
EF1	A house sustained considerable damage to its roof and porch, a modified mobile home was shifted off its foundation, and a small cabin had roofing blown off. A shed was moved, another shed was thrown from its foundation, and numerous trees were snapped or uprooted. The tornado dissipated near the Jackson County line.						
EF1	SE of Island City	Owsley	KY	37.3533°N 83.7714°W	13:15–13:19	1.52 mi (2.45 km)	175 yd (160 m)
EF1	This tornado snapped or uprooted multiple trees, one of which fell on an abandoned house. Two mobile homes were damaged, and a small shed-like residence was destroyed. This was the first tornado in Owsley County since 2004 and only the third recorded tornado in the county since reliable records began in 1950.						
EF2	N of Center Grove to S of Dodson Branch	Jackson	TN	36.2793°N 85.6123°W	00:10–00:18	4.2 mi (6.8 km)	650 yd (590 m)
EF2	A strong tornado destroyed multiple barns and snapped or uprooted many large trees in wooded areas. A manufactured home had much of its roof torn off, and a few other residences had less severe roof and gutter damage.						
EF1	NW of Algood to ENE of Rickman	Putnam, Overton	TN	36.2683°N 85.4768°W	00:20–00:34	7.6 mi (12.2 km)	400 yd (370 m)
EF1	Multiple homes suffered heavy damage to their roofs and garages. A gas station and a couple of nearby businesses sustained minor damage, and a power pole was snapped. A barn was destroyed, a few other barns and outbuildings were damaged, and trees were snapped or uprooted. One person was injured.						
EF1	SW of Crawford to SW of Wilder	Overton	TN	36.247°N 85.206°W	00:41–00:51	5.34 mi (8.59 km)	500 yd (460 m)
EF1	This tornado impacted the community of Hanging Limb and surrounding rural areas, snapping trees along its path. A house had its front porch ripped off, another home sustained considerable roof damage, and a cabin had minor roof damage. A church and some outbuildings sustained roof damage as well, a camper was flipped over onto its side, and a detached garage was destroyed. One person was injured.						
EF2	SE of Wilder to S of Sunbright	Fentress, Morgan	TN	36.2308°N 85.0549°W	00:53–01:22	21.92 mi (35.28 km)	200 yd (180 m)
EF2	2 deaths – A long-tracked, high-end EF2 tornado touched down in Fentress County, where a chicken house and a pole barn were destroyed, some outbuildings were damaged, and a house suffered roof damage. Multiple trees were downed along this initial segment of the path, one of which landed on a car. The tornado reached its peak intensity as it crossed into Morgan County and passed to the south of Deer Lodge, completely destroying two mobile homes and killing two people in one of them. Some barns and outbuildings were damaged or destroyed in this area as well, and countless large trees were snapped or uprooted in densely-forested areas before the tornado dissipated. Three people were injured.						
EF1	S of Thorn Hill	Grainger	TN	36.3534°N 83.4698°W	02:26–02:32	3.51 mi (5.65 km)	700 yd (640 m)
EF1	This high-end EF1 tornado completely destroyed a large barn and overturned a tanker trailer. A small shed was flipped over, some other outbuildings were damaged, and a church sustained window and siding damage. Trees were snapped along the path, and part of a wooden fence was blown over.						

=== February 11 event ===
List of confirmed tornadoes – Tuesday, February 11, 2025
EF#	Location	County / Parish	State	Start Coord.	Time (UTC)	Path length	Max width
EF1	Northwestern Ferry Pass	Escambia	FL	30.5238°N 87.1958°W	22:21–22:22	0.49 mi (0.79 km)	30 yd (27 m)
EF1	A brief tornado occurred in an industrial area in Ferry Pass, where several boats were overturned or pushed into fencing at a boat manufacturing business. Some metal warehouse buildings sustained considerable damage to their roofs and side paneling, and a few of them had their doors blown out. Some minor tree damage occurred as well.						

=== February 12 event ===
List of confirmed tornadoes – Wednesday, February 12, 2025
EF#	Location	County / Parish	State	Start Coord.	Time (UTC)	Path length	Max width
EF0	Eastern Columbia	Marion	MS	31.2439°N 89.8054°W	22:07–22:10	1.95 mi (3.14 km)	70 yd (64 m)
EF0	This high-end EF0 tornado impacted the east side of Columbia, heavily damaging a hardware store housed in a metal building. Numerous homes had minor roof damage, trees were damaged, and a couple of sheds were destroyed.						
EF2	NE of Frankville to SE of McEntyre	Washington, Clarke	AL	31.6736°N 88.0884°W	00:15–00:28	11.89 mi (19.14 km)	650 yd (590 m)
EF2	A tornado began west of the Tombigbee River, first downing multiple trees as it crossed SR 69. It intensified to low-end EF2 strength as it continued to the northeast and crossed US 84, snapping or uprooting numerous large trees. A poorly-constructed house collapsed, and additional areas of significant tree damage were observed in remote forested areas farther to the northeast before the tornado dissipated. Due to limited road access, a section of the tornado's path was evaluated using satellite and drone imagery.						
EF0	S of De Soto	Clarke	MS	31.9373°N 88.7315°W	01:22–01:25	1.28 mi (2.06 km)	50 yd (46 m)
EF0	The tops of trees and large branches were snapped as a result of this weak tornado.						
EF3	E of Laurel to SE of Matherville	Wayne	MS	31.6765°N 88.9308°W	01:44–02:14	27.49 mi (44.24 km)	910 yd (830 m)
EF3	This intense multiple-vortex tornado moved through Wayne County, initially causing minor damage to trees and structures as it touched down in a rural area to the east of Laurel. It then intensified significantly as it moved to the northeast and reached peak strength near the rural community of Whistler. A few houses suffered major structural damage, including loss of exterior walls, and several single and double-wide mobile homes were completely swept away and obliterated. Debris from the mobile homes was scattered long distances across fields, and their metal frames were twisted and thrown up to 200 yd (180 m) away. A pickup truck, pieces of farming equipment, cattle trailers, and several RVs were thrown and destroyed as well. Major tree damage occurred in wooded areas as countless large trees were snapped, stripped of their branches, and partially debarked, and some areas suffered total deforestation. Power poles were snapped, some ground scouring was observed in open fields, and barns, outbuildings, and chicken houses were also destroyed. The tornado gradually weakened after crossing US 45, but still caused significant damage to many trees and a few structures before it dissipated. Two people were injured.						

=== February 13 event ===
List of confirmed tornadoes – Thursday, February 13, 2025
EF#	Location	County / Parish	State	Start Coord.	Time (UTC)	Path length	Max width
EF0	Southeastern Oxnard	Ventura	CA	34.1618°N 119.1547°W	23:27–23:29	0.63 mi (1.01 km)	20 yd (18 m)
EF0	A high-end EF0 tornado touched down in the southeastern part of Oxnard and damaged a dozen mobile homes in two mobile home parks. Damage included shingle and roof loss, destroyed carports and metal porch roofs, toppled fences, and shattered windows. Several large tree branches were broken as well.						

=== February 15 event ===
List of confirmed tornadoes – Saturday, February 15, 2025
EF#	Location	County / Parish	State	Start Coord.	Time (UTC)	Path length	Max width
EF2	S of Bradford	Gibson	TN	36.0005°N 88.835°W	01:01–01:11	4.08 mi (6.57 km)	300 yd (270 m)
EF2	This low-end EF2 tornado crossed US-45E south of Bradford, where several homes had large sections of their roofs torn off, one of which was shifted off its foundation. A barn was destroyed and many large trees were downed, one of which landed on a house. A few mobile homes sustained minor damage shortly before the tornado lifted.						
EF1	NE of Prices Mill to ENE of Neosheo	Simpson	KY	36.6926°N 86.7157°W	03:46–03:51	4.33 mi (6.97 km)	150 yd (140 m)
EF1	This tornado initially destroyed an older garage at a farm, and sheet metal from the structure was scattered downwind and wrapped around tree branches. It then severely damaged three barns, lifting wood anchors and throwing sheet metal up to 0.25 mi (0.40 km) away. The most significant damage occurred at Sundown Stables, where a horse arena was thrown into a barn, causing major structural damage. Multiple trees were snapped or uprooted along the path.						
EF0	S of Raymond	Hinds	MS	32.1855°N 90.4122°W	04:04–04:06	2.64 mi (4.25 km)	50 yd (46 m)
EF0	Several small trees and branches were snapped by this weak tornado.						
EF1	WSW of Shannon to NW of Carolina	Lee	MS	34.0809°N 88.8233°W	04:10–04:26	16.63 mi (26.76 km)	350 yd (320 m)
EF1	A high-end EF1 tornado damaged multiple homes along its path. A few homes had large parts of their roofs removed, and one house had its carport destroyed. A mobile home was damaged and shifted off its foundation, outbuildings were damaged or destroyed, and a car was badly damaged. Many trees were downed and several power poles were snapped as well.						
EF1	NW of Carolina to SW of Beans Ferry	Itawamba	MS	34.1506°N 88.5195°W	04:27–04:34	6.62 mi (10.65 km)	300 yd (270 m)
EF1	Many trees were snapped or uprooted and the roof of a home was damaged.						
EF0	N of Clay	Itawamba	MS	34.3294°N 88.3419°W	04:39–04:40	1.03 mi (1.66 km)	75 yd (69 m)
EF0	A few trees were downed and a home had its metal roof peeled off by this high-end EF0 tornado.						
EF1	NE of Clay	Itawamba	MS	34.3323°N 88.223°W	04:45–04:47	1.41 mi (2.27 km)	200 yd (180 m)
EF1	Multiple trees were snapped or uprooted.						
EF1	SE of Vina	Franklin	AL	34.3509°N 88.077°W	04:54–05:03	6.01 mi (9.67 km)	75 yd (69 m)
EF1	A tornado touched down and moved northeast, causing major damage to the metal roof of a residence along a county highway, with a large uprooted tree falling onto the garage. It continued across SR 172 producing additional tree damage, heavily damaging the roof of a chicken house and causing minor shingle damage to a home. The tornado tracked through mainly wooded areas with scattered tree damage before lifting just west of Bear Creek.						
EF0	SSW of Russellville	Franklin	AL	34.4231°N 87.7915°W	05:12–05:15	2.89 mi (4.65 km)	75 yd (69 m)
EF0	A high-end EF0 tornado touched down, uprooting trees in its initial path. It tracked northeast, damaging the roof of a chicken house, causing minor roof damage to a single-family home, and damaging another chicken house. After crossing US 43, the tornado downed trees onto two homes, causing roof damage before lifting.						
EF1	Tuscumbia to Muscle Shoals	Colbert	AL	34.7212°N 87.7166°W	05:12–05:21	4.3 mi (6.9 km)	215 yd (197 m)
EF1	This tornado touched down in a neighborhood southwest of downtown Tuscumbia, where RE Thompson Intermediate School had its roof blown off, and many trees were downed, some of which fell onto homes and caused roof damage. As it moved through the downtown area, power lines and traffic signals were destroyed, and a building had its metal roof removed. Trees were downed on the east side of Tuscumbia before the tornado entered Muscle Shoals, snapping numerous additional trees, damaging the canopy of a gas station, and downing fences. It then tracked through residential areas in the eastern part of Muscle Shoals, causing more tree damage before lifting. This was the first of two tornadoes that struck Tuscumbia and Muscle Shoals in 2025.						
EF2	ESE of Russellville to SE of Littleville	Franklin	AL	34.4791°N 87.6587°W	05:20–05:27	3.93 mi (6.32 km)	170 yd (160 m)
EF2	A low-end EF2 tornado touched down in Franklin County and first impacted areas in and around the small community of Waco, where homes sustained partial roof loss, other houses were damaged by falling trees, and a mobile home was flipped over onto its side. Sheds and outbuildings were damaged in this area as well, and an ATV was lofted and thrown. The tornado then crossed SR 24 and moved to the northeast, where the top portion of a large silo collapsed, some outbuildings were destroyed, and many power lines and large trees were downed, some of which landed on homes and cars. A house was completely unroofed shortly before the tornado dissipated. One person was injured.						
EF1	WSW of Killen to Southern Elgin to WNW of Rogersville	Lauderdale	AL	34.841°N 87.5765°W	05:22–05:33	13.42 mi (21.60 km)	250 yd (230 m)
EF1	This tornado first touched down near Killen in the Kendale Gardens subdivision, where several trees were snapped or uprooted, including one large tree that fell onto a house, causing structural damage. It moved eastward, crossing Shoal Creek and a small section of Wilson Lake, damaging trees along its path. The tornado continued through areas on the north side of Wilson Lake, snapping more trees and causing some additional tree damage on the south side of Elgin. It then crossed Second Creek and downed some tree branches before dissipating. This was the first of three tornadoes that struck Elgin in 2025.						
EF1	ENE of Decatur to Collinsville to NW of Bailey	Newton, Lauderdale	MS	32.4735°N 89.0254°W	05:31–05:48	16.7 mi (26.9 km)	720 yd (660 m)
EF1	A tornado initially caused tree damage and peeled tin off of a barn roof upon touching down. It then intensified as it moved east, snapping trees, knocking down power poles, and inflicting roof and carport damage to homes. After crossing MS 494 into Collinsville, the tornado significantly damaged the roof of a carwash and snapped numerous trees, one of which landed on and damaged a house. It then exited Collinsville and continued toward Okatibbee Lake, uprooting trees, damaging a park station, and causing some additional minor structural damage before dissipating.						
EF1	SSW of Town Creek	Lawrence	AL	34.5487°N 87.4985°W	05:33–05:34	1.5 mi (2.4 km)	150 yd (140 m)
EF1	Farm outbuildings were damaged and trees were snapped or uprooted.						
EF1	Rogersville	Lauderdale	AL	34.8259°N 87.2898°W	05:37–05:39	0.38 mi (0.61 km)	115 yd (105 m)
EF1	A brief tornado occurred in Rogersville, where several businesses experienced minor damage to awnings, had portions of their roofs damaged, and had windows blown out. Power lines and power poles were downed, and dozens of trees were snapped or uprooted in town.						

=== February 16 event ===
List of confirmed tornadoes – Sunday, February 16, 2025
EF#	Location	County / Parish	State	Start Coord.	Time (UTC)	Path length	Max width
EF1	S of Varnado	Washington	LA	30.85°N 89.87°W	06:27–06:34	6.01 mi (9.67 km)	75 yd (69 m)
EF1	Pine trees were snapped or uprooted in a wooded area.						
EF0	Moundville	Hale	AL	32.9881°N 87.6541°W	06:33–06:36	1.62 mi (2.61 km)	150 yd (140 m)
EF0	A weak tornado touched down just west of Moundville, snapping several tree tops and branches. Upon entering Moundville, the tornado uprooted a few trees, two of which fell on and damaged houses. A barn sustained roof damage and a trampoline was also flipped. One person was injured.						
EF1	NNE of Gallion to SW of Marion	Hale, Perry	AL	32.5582°N 87.6852°W	06:52–07:10	18.37 mi (29.56 km)	200 yd (180 m)
EF1	This tornado touched down west of SR 69, causing extensive tree damage and snapping 40 to 50 power poles as it moved eastward. It intensified east of SR 25, severely damaging or destroying multiple manufactured homes and injuring two people. The tornado continued into Perry County, causing minor tree damage and destroying farm outbuildings before dissipating.						
EF1	E of Snead	Marshall	AL	34.133°N 86.3162°W	07:05–07:11	0.76 mi (1.22 km)	30 yd (27 m)
EF1	A brief tornado destroyed several barns and outbuildings and snapped trees. A power pole was also snapped, and a cattle trailer was overturned and moved several feet.						
EF0	WNW of Weogufka to SW of Mount Olive	Coosa	AL	33.0251°N 86.3541°W	08:00–08:12	12.2 mi (19.6 km)	250 yd (230 m)
EF0	Numerous trees were snapped or uprooted along the path of this tornado. Some power lines were damaged due to trees falling on them as well.						
EF1	NW of Church Hill	Tallapoosa	AL	32.6931°N 85.8422°W	08:42–08:43	1.79 mi (2.88 km)	100 yd (91 m)
EF1	Multiple trees were snapped or uprooted south of SR 50.						
EF1	NNE of Cecil to NE of Cross Keys	Macon	AL	32.3484°N 85.9745°W	08:47–08:54	7.52 mi (12.10 km)	450 yd (410 m)
EF1	This high-end EF1 tornado damaged the roofs of several outbuildings and homes. Numerous trees were also snapped and uprooted.						
EF0	NNE of Hogansville to SW of Grantville	Troup	GA	33.22°N 84.89°W	09:25–09:27	1.48 mi (2.38 km)	75 yd (69 m)
EF0	The roof of a barndominium was torn off and tossed into trees. Several trees were also snapped and uprooted.						
EF1	SSW of Worthville to WSW of Prospect	Butts, Newton, Jasper	GA	33.38°N 83.93°W	10:16–10:23	6.72 mi (10.81 km)	200 yd (180 m)
EF1	Numerous trees were snapped or uprooted by this tornado, including one that fell onto and severely damaged a home. Several other houses lost portions of their roofs or sustained damage from falling trees. A business along SR 36 suffered roof damage, and the tornado's path overlapped with an area still recovering from an EF2 tornado in 2023. The tornado weakened near the end of its path, causing sporadic tree damage before lifting.						

=== February 24 event ===
List of confirmed tornadoes – Monday, February 24, 2025
EF#	Location	County / Parish	State	Start Coord.	Time (UTC)	Path length	Max width
EFU	WSW of Appleby	Codington	SD	44.8152°N 97.0779°W	22:11	0.01 mi (0.016 km)	5 yd (4.6 m)
EFU	A low-topped supercell produced a short-lived weak tornado in an open field, causing no damage. This was the first ever documented tornado to touch down in South Dakota in the month of February.						

== March ==
Confirmed tornadoes by Enhanced Fujita rating
EFU	EF0	EF1	EF2	EF3	EF4	EF5	Total
2	73	114	37	11	3	0	240

=== March 4 event ===
List of confirmed tornadoes – Tuesday, March 4, 2025
EF#	Location	County / Parish	State	Start Coord.	Time (UTC)	Path length	Max width
EF1	N of Lone Grove	Carter	OK	34.232°N 97.268°W	10:28–10:29	0.5 mi (0.80 km)	120 yd (110 m)
EF1	Three homes were damaged, and three people were injured in one of the homes.						
EF1	S of Bridgeport	Wise	TX	33.1057°N 97.7517°W	10:30–10:35	3.17 mi (5.10 km)	250 yd (230 m)
EF1	This high-end EF1 tornado ripped most of the roof off of a home and caused minor damage to two nearby outbuildings. The tornado continued causing fascia and roof damage to frame homes, manufactured homes, and outbuildings before lifting. Damage to tree limbs also occurred.						
EF0	Northern Gene Autry	Carter	OK	34.287°N 97.038°W	10:43–10:44	1.2 mi (1.9 km)	40 yd (37 m)
EF0	A mobile home, a barn, and another building sustained minor damage.						
EF0	W of Fittstown	Pontotoc	OK	34.545°N 96.726°W	11:03–11:12	8.8 mi (14.2 km)	100 yd (91 m)
EF0	An RV was blown over and an outbuilding damaged near the beginning of the path. The tornado moved northeast damaging trees and producing shingle damage to a home. One other outbuilding was damaged just west of US 377 as the tornado was dissipating.						
EF1	Ada	Pontotoc	OK	34.768°N 96.706°W	11:11–11:15	3.7 mi (6.0 km)	200 yd (180 m)
EF1	This tornado began in western Ada and moved directly through the center of town, causing considerable damage. An old brick building was destroyed, while apartment buildings, businesses, and a school suffered partial roof loss. Houses, mobile homes, utility poles, and trees were also damaged throughout the city. One person was injured.						
EF1	NW of Stonewall	Pontotoc	OK	34.694°N 96.595°W	11:16–11:17	1 mi (1.6 km)	40 yd (37 m)
EF1	A volunteer fire station was heavily damaged, the roof of a home was damaged, and numerous trees were snapped.						
EF1	Irving	Dallas	TX	32.8179°N 96.9572°W	11:24–11:25	0.42 mi (0.68 km)	85 yd (78 m)
EF1	A brief high-end EF1 tornado touched down in Irving and downed multiple trees, one of which fell onto and damaged a vehicle. Every building at an apartment complex sustained heavy roof damage, including partial roof loss. The Irving Police Academy Family Advocacy building lost about half of its roof, and a nearby daycare center was damaged.						
EF1	Northern Allen	Pontotoc	OK	34.856°N 96.483°W	11:25–11:30	4.8 mi (7.7 km)	150 yd (140 m)
EF1	A tornado formed to the north of the rural community of Steedman and moved to the northeast, where a mobile home, a barn, and trees were damaged. It moved through the north side of Allen shortly before it dissipated, damaging multiple buildings.						
EF1	Nida	Johnston	OK	34.139°N 96.503°W	11:37–11:39	1.56 mi (2.51 km)	100 yd (91 m)
EF1	Barns, outbuildings and a mobile home were destroyed.						
EF1	NE of Horntown	Hughes	OK	35.097°N 96.229°W	11:46–11:49	2.88 mi (4.63 km)	50 yd (46 m)
EF1	A low-end EF1 tornado damaged at least two buildings.						
EF1	SSW of Henryetta	Okmulgee	OK	35.404°N 96.001°W	12:06–12:09	1.8 mi (2.9 km)	375 yd (343 m)
EF1	This tornado damaged and destroyed outbuildings, damaged homes, and uprooted trees.						
EF1	SE of Henryetta to ESE of Dewar	Okmulgee	OK	35.423°N 95.957°W	12:10–12:15	3.3 mi (5.3 km)	350 yd (320 m)
EF1	Large tree limbs and trees were snapped, and some outbuildings were damaged.						
EF1	NNW of Morris to S of Bald Hill	Okmulgee	OK	35.66°N 95.893°W	12:22–12:25	2.7 mi (4.3 km)	400 yd (370 m)
EF1	An RV was rolled, several power poles were snapped, three homes had roof damage, and multiple tree limbs were snapped.						
EF0	N of Eram	Okmulgee	OK	35.622°N 95.787°W	12:25–12:29	3.1 mi (5.0 km)	250 yd (230 m)
EF0	Large tree limbs were broken and the roof of a house was slightly damaged.						
EF1	NW of Eufaula	McIntosh	OK	35.301°N 95.622°W	12:33–12:34	0.7 mi (1.1 km)	150 yd (140 m)
EF1	A low-end EF1 tornado damaged outbuildings and homes. Several trees were downed as well.						
EF0	ESE of Checotah	McIntosh	OK	35.438°N 95.458°W	12:51–12:53	1.6 mi (2.6 km)	150 yd (140 m)
EF0	The roof of a barn was blown off, a home had its roof damaged, and numerous large tree limbs were snapped.						
EF1	NNE of Winnsboro to N of Pittsburg	Franklin, Camp	TX	33.0033°N 95.2739°W	13:15–13:35	18.44 mi (29.68 km)	858 yd (785 m)
EF1	This tornado began north of Winnsboro and moved east, snapping or uprooting many trees and causing significant damage to a fire department building, which had most of its metal roof panels removed. A house had much of its roof blown off, a manufactured home suffered roof and wall damage, a church lost a small part of its roof, and an outbuilding had roof damage as well. As it continued eastward, the tornado downed more trees and damaged homes and outbuildings. At a campground near Lake Bob Sandlin, an outbuilding was destroyed, two RVs were overturned, and three occupants were injured. After crossing the lake, the tornado caused sporadic tree damage before lifting near the Camp/Titus county line.						
EF1	SW of Omaha to SSE of Naples	Morris	TX	33.103°N 94.8072°W	13:44–13:55	8.98 mi (14.45 km)	735 yd (672 m)
EF1	A low-end EF1 tornado uprooted numerous trees and broke large branches.						
EF1	S of Avery to NW of New Boston	Red River, Bowie	TX	33.4345°N 94.7749°W	13:47–14:07	18.58 mi (29.90 km)	850 yd (780 m)
EF1	This tornado lifted the roof off of a shed shortly after it touched town and caused tree damage as it moved to the east-northeast. Trees were snapped and a couple of outbuildings were damaged or destroyed in and around the rural communities of New Hope and Hubbard. Near US 82, the tornado destroyed a shed and overturned some trailers before it lifted.						
EF1	N of Naples to Southern New Boston	Bowie	TX	33.3404°N 94.7073°W	13:51–14:09	18.87 mi (30.37 km)	580 yd (530 m)
EF1	A high-end EF1 QLCS tornado caused extensive tree damage along its path, uprooting or snapping trees and downing power lines. It removed the metal roof of a house, destroyed a large metal outbuilding at the Barry Telford Unit prison, and overturned three nearby camper trailers. The tornado continued northeast, causing tree damage and downing tree limbs in the southern portion of New Boston before dissipating.						
EF1	Eastern Scottsville	Harrison	TX	32.5412°N 94.2378°W	14:46–14:47	1.04 mi (1.67 km)	100 yd (91 m)
EF1	Trees were snapped or uprooted on the east side of Scottsville.						
EF1	NNE of Waskom to WSW of Blanchard	Caddo	LA	32.5589°N 94.0328°W	15:00–15:04	3.9 mi (6.3 km)	114 yd (104 m)
EF1	A small metal truss communications tower and pump station were bent in half, and several trees were snapped or uprooted.						
EF1	Northern Shreveport	Caddo	LA	32.5664°N 93.7831°W	15:19–15:20	0.82 mi (1.32 km)	225 yd (206 m)
EF1	This brief tornado occurred in the northern part of Shreveport, where it removed a few metal roof panels from an outbuilding, snapped a few trees, and downed large tree limbs.						
EF1	NW of Woodville	Tyler	TX	30.8225°N 94.4954°W	15:49–15:52	0.51 mi (0.82 km)	75 yd (69 m)
EF1	A brief tornado touched down near US 287, destroying an outbuilding and snapping trees. It damaged a home, which had portion of its roofing peeled off and also had wooden two-by-fours impaled into its roof.						
EF1	NE of Dubberly to WSW of Athens	Claiborne	LA	32.6138°N 93.163°W	16:06–16:07	1.82 mi (2.93 km)	300 yd (270 m)
EF1	Numerous trees and power poles were snapped by this high-end EF1 tornado. A few trees fell onto and damaged structures.						
EF1	ESE of Pineland to SE of Hemphill	Sabine	TX	31.206°N 93.824°W	16:29–16:36	5.58 mi (8.98 km)	625 yd (572 m)
EF1	This tornado touched down in the Sabine National Forest, snapping and uprooting numerous softwood trees. It continued northeast through inaccessible forested areas, crossing SH 87 before lifting within a cove at the Toledo Bend Reservoir.						
EF1	N of Almadane	Vernon	LA	30.9795°N 93.4962°W	17:01–17:03	1.06 mi (1.71 km)	100 yd (91 m)
EF1	A tornado touched down east of LA 111, where minor tree damage occurred and a structure had roofing torn off. It continued to the northeast, snapping several trees and causing additional tree damage in inaccessible areas.						
EFU	Fort Polk	Vernon	LA	31.0876°N 93.1643°W	17:27–17:30	2.24 mi (3.60 km)	10 yd (9.1 m)
EFU	Downed trees were reported in an inaccessible area. Satellite imagery will be used to assess further damage.						
EF1	Boyce	Rapides, Grant	LA	31.3777°N 92.6978°W	17:50–17:57	3.38 mi (5.44 km)	100 yd (91 m)
EF1	This tornado began in a field southwest of I-49, removing power lines from transmission towers. The tornado then crossed the interstate and moved into Boyce, where it damaged several homes, destroyed outbuildings, and caused varying degrees of tree damage in town. It then crossed the Red River into Grant Parish, damaging some trees before quickly lifting.						
EF1	ESE of Kelly	Caldwell	LA	31.9526°N 92.1085°W	18:10–18:11	0.44 mi (0.71 km)	200 yd (180 m)
EF1	Numerous trees were snapped or uprooted. A large hay barn lost most of its roof, and a single-family home sustained minor roof damage.						
EF1	ENE of Donaldsonville	Ascension	LA	30.1121°N 90.9584°W	22:52–22:53	0.30 mi (0.48 km)	50 yd (46 m)
EF1	Four homes were damaged and had parts of their roofs removed. Front porch pillars were moved or ripped away, a garage door was blown in, and fences were damaged as well.						
EF0	Gramercy	St. James	LA	30.0674°N 90.6986°W	23:17–23:18	0.29 mi (0.47 km)	75 yd (69 m)
EF0	Some homes in Gramercy had minor roof damage, and fences were also damaged.						
EF2	NW of Waynesboro	Wayne	MS	31.6904°N 88.7855°W	00:24–00:32	3.98 mi (6.41 km)	150 yd (140 m)
EF2	This strong tornado began in a forested area to the east of Whistler, rapidly intensifying as it crossed US 84, where it rolled a vehicle and destroyed several chicken houses. It quickly reached peak intensity as large tree trunks were snapped, a manufactured home was completely destroyed after being thrown over 50 yd (46 m), and a house was heavily damaged and had half of its roof torn off. A UTV was thrown 25 yd (23 m) into the house, and an outdoor kitchen on the property was destroyed. Farther along the path, another manufactured home was rolled and destroyed, a house had major roof damage, and a pickup truck was lofted and dropped 20 yd (18 m) away. The tornado then weakened and caused additional minor damage to trees and a manufactured home before dissipating in a forested area. Four people were injured. This tornado occurred near the same area that was impacted by an EF3 tornado the previous month on February 12.						
EF1	NW of Agricola	George	MS	30.8415°N 88.5696°W	01:55–01:56	0.92 mi (1.48 km)	30 yd (27 m)
EF1	A farm building was destroyed, a large outbuilding was rolled off its foundation, and a couple of trees were snapped or uprooted.						
EF1	S of Ironton to NW of Pointe à la Hache	Plaquemines	LA	29.5576°N 89.9547°W	02:13–02:20	5.49 mi (8.84 km)	75 yd (69 m)
EF1	A high-end EF1 tornado caused significant to buildings at a camp near Lake Laurier. It then weakened, damaging a few trees before lifting.						
EF1	Port Sulphur	Plaquemines	LA	29.52°N 89.73°W	02:33–02:37	2.88 mi (4.63 km)	50 yd (46 m)
EF1	This tornado quickly developed near LA 23, blowing over power poles in Port Sulphur before crossing the Mississippi River. Numerous trees were visibly damaged on high resolution satellite imagery across the river with a faint damage path continuing into the marsh thereafter. The end point of this tornado is estimated by radar and high resolution satellite imagery.						
EF0	Eastern Woodlawn Beach	Santa Rosa	FL	30.3984°N 86.974°W	05:06–05:07	0.32 mi (0.51 km)	75 yd (69 m)
EF0	A high-end EF0 tornado caused minor shingle damage to several homes on the east side of Woodlawn Beach, destroyed a metal awning, and overturned an RV along its path. Another RV was lifted and tossed approximately 50 yd (46 m) before the tornado dissipated.						

=== March 5 event ===
List of confirmed tornadoes – Wednesday, March 5, 2025
EF#	Location	County / Parish	State	Start Coord.	Time (UTC)	Path length	Max width
EF1	Northwestern Unionville	Union	NC	35.088°N 80.577°W	13:34–13:37	2.25 mi (3.62 km)	75 yd (69 m)
EF1	This tornado began on the Porter Ridge High School campus, damaging a tennis court, collapsing two storage sheds, and snapping tree branches and a light pole. The tornado then damaged a house under construction, ripping part of its roof off. Farther along the path, another house suffered minor structural damage and numerous trees were uprooted or snapped. Several wooden power poles were snapped before the tornado lifted to the west of US 601.						
EF0	SE of Almondsville	Gloucester	VA	37.387°N 76.645°W	20:39–20:40	0.35 mi (0.56 km)	75 yd (69 m)
EF0	A waterspout moved onshore from the York River, downing several large trees, displacing a large propane tank several hundred feet, and damaging a pillar and shingles on a cottage.						

=== March 10 event ===
List of confirmed tornadoes – Monday, March 10, 2025
EF#	Location	County / Parish	State	Start Coord.	Time (UTC)	Path length	Max width
EF2	Northern Wekiwa Springs to Southwestern Lake Mary	Seminole	FL	28.7109°N 81.4152°W	13:35–13:41	4 mi (6.4 km)	300 yd (270 m)
EF2	Trees were downed as the tornado first touched down in a subdivision near the southeastern edge of Wekiwa Springs State Park. Damage became more significant as the tornado moved northeastward through another subdivision in the southwestern part of Lake Mary. Several homes were damaged in this area, including a frail two-story home that partially collapsed. The tornado weakened as it crossed I-4, impacting the studios of WOFL as they covered the tornado live on air. The tornado dissipated to the northeast shortly after.						

=== March 13 event ===
List of confirmed tornadoes – Thursday, March 13, 2025
EF#	Location	County / Parish	State	Start Coord.	Time (UTC)	Path length	Max width
EF0	Pico Rivera to northwestern Whittier	Los Angeles	CA	33.9948°N 118.0837°W	10:15–10:16	1 mi (1.6 km)	80 yd (73 m)
EF0	A high-end EF0 tornado uprooted a few trees, downed numerous large tree branches, and damaged roofs. In some cases, trees fell on residences and vehicles causing additional damage.						

=== March 14 event ===
List of confirmed tornadoes – Friday, March 14, 2025
EF#	Location	County / Parish	State	Start Coord.	Time (UTC)	Path length	Max width
EF1	N of Seymour to ESE of Grovespring	Webster, Wright	MO	37.2°N 92.79°W	23:40–00:02	19.75 mi (31.78 km)	400 yd (370 m)
EF1	A roof was torn off a home, numerous barns were destroyed, a cell phone tower was collapsed, and numerous trees were snapped in a cyclonic pattern.						
EF1	NW of Lynchburg to WSW of Edgar Springs	Laclede, Texas, Pulaski	MO	37.5°N 92.34°W	00:12–00:36	22.26 mi (35.82 km)	200 yd (180 m)
EF1	An outbuilding was levelled and a home sustained minor roof damage.						
EF1	NE of Spring Creek to N of Vida	Phelps	MO	37.80°N 91.94°W	00:42–00:53	10.24 mi (16.48 km)	400 yd (370 m)
EF1	This high-end EF1 tornado caused severe damage to a barn, and tree damage was noted all along its track across northeastern Mark Twain National Forest. Its track was identified mostly through satellite imagery. It preceded the stronger Rolla EF2 tornado, listed below.						
EF2	SE of Doolittle to eastern Rolla	Phelps	MO	37.902°N 91.832°W	00:50–00:58	10.3 mi (16.6 km)	175 yd (160 m)
EF2	This strong tornado tracked through Phelps County, including Rolla, beginning in the Mark Twain National Forest. It uprooted and damaged trees along its intermittent path before striking areas along US 63 south of Rolla, where homes and businesses were damaged. In southeast Rolla, some homes sustained significant damage, while multiple schools and other businesses had roof damage. One person was injured in this area. Damage became more scattered in eastern Rolla, then weakened after crossing I-44, though a barn roof was damaged, more trees were uprooted, and a mobile home was shifted off its piers before the tornado lifted near the Little Prairie Conservation Area.						
EF1	Elmont to Union	Franklin	MO	38.23°N 91.242°W	01:29–01:52	19.8 mi (31.9 km)	100 yd (91 m)
EF1	This tornado touched down in Elmont, primarily damaging trees and a large barn before moving northeast through the Long Ridge Conservation Area. It caused its most significant damage near Route 47 south of Union, where several homes, outbuildings, and telephone poles were affected before the tornado dissipated.						
EF1	S of Kohl City to SW of Etlah	Franklin	MO	38.5799°N 91.3592°W	01:33–01:39	5.57 mi (8.96 km)	220 yd (200 m)
EF1	One outbuilding was destroyed, another one was damaged, and a home suffered roof damage. Trees also sustained damage, including some that were snapped or uprooted.						
EF3	Gamaliel, AR to Bakersfield, MO to E of West Plains, MO	Baxter (AR), Ozark (MO), Howell (MO)	AR, MO	36.4552°N 92.2359°W	01:34–02:16	35.74 mi (57.52 km)	1,200 yd (1,100 m)
EF3	3 deaths – See section on this tornado – Four people were injured.						
EF0	NE of Wilton	Muscatine, Cedar	IA	41.5977°N 90.9983°W	01:49–01:51	1.88 mi (3.03 km)	50 yd (46 m)
EF0	This high-end EF0 tornado caused damage to roofs, outbuildings, and trees.						
EF2	Eastern Villa Ridge to western Wildwood	Franklin, St. Louis	MO	38.4604°N 90.868°W	01:52–02:10	17.76 mi (28.58 km)	644 yd (589 m)
EF2	This strong tornado developed north of I-44 on the eastern side of Villa Ridge, quickly intensifying and severely damaging multiple homes at high-end EF2 strength with winds of 130 miles per hour (210 km/h). It continued northeast, damaging an industrial facility, causing significant tree damage, and knocking the top portion off a microwave tower before moving into St. Louis County. The tornado caused additional tree damage before dissipating near a bend in Route 100. One person was indirectly injured, and the tornado caused $6.5 million in damage.						
EF3	NNE of Brandsville to Fremont to SE of Ellington	Oregon, Shannon, Carter, Reynolds	MO	36.67°N 91.674°W	02:11–03:29	57.24 mi (92.12 km)	800 yd (730 m)
EF3	This long-tracked, high-end EF3 tornado began northeast of Brandsville in Oregon County and moved northeast, passing south of Rover where two homes were pushed off their foundations. It tore the roof from another, collapsed two high-voItage transmission line poles, and uprooted thousands of trees in the Mark Twain National Forest before entering Shannon County. In southeastern Shannon County, it uprooted hundreds of trees before intensifying in Carter County. There, hundreds more trees were snapped or uprooted, a few were debarked, and a stee barn was lofted several hundred yards. Several homes were completely destroyed near Fremont, with additional damage occurring in the northeastern of Carter County before crossing into Reynolds County. In southern Reynolds County, the tornado shattered the windows of a home and continued northeast, snapping and uprooting trees before lifting.						
EF4	NNE of Alco, AR to Fifty-Six, AR to NW of Harviell, MO	Stone (AR), Izard (AR), Sharp (AR), Randolph (AR), Ripley (MO), Butler (MO)	AR, MO	35.8935°N 92.3423°W	02:11–04:24	118.96 mi (191.45 km)	1,400 yd (1,300 m)
EF4	See article on this tornado – Four people were injured.						
EF2	Chesterfield to Bridgeton to Florissant	St. Louis	MO	38.6329°N 90.5875°W	02:16–02:39	20.67 mi (33.27 km)	880 yd (800 m)
EF2	Widespread damage to homes, outbuildings, power poles, and trees occurred, including some homes that had their roofs at least partially removed. The tornado also crossed a runway at the St. Louis Lambert International Airport.						
EF2	Morse Mill to Arnold to E of Mehlville	Jefferson, St. Louis	MO	38.2701°N 90.6488°W	02:18–02:39	25.33 mi (40.76 km)	850 yd (780 m)
EF2	Dozens of homes suffered roof and exterior wall damage, including some that had their roofs at least partially removed. Mobile homes and outbuildings were heavily damaged or destroyed and many trees were snapped or uprooted. A business in Arnold also suffered roof damage. The tornado then entered St. Louis County, where it caused more roof damage in Oakville, before dissipating east of the Jefferson Barracks National Cemetery.						
EF3	NE of Koshkonong to E of Greer	Oregon	MO	36.607°N 91.65°W	02:36–03:06	23.54 mi (37.88 km)	800 yd (730 m)
EF3	This intense tornado primarily caused damage to trees and several outbuildings along its path, but a ground-level home sustained EF3 damage north of Alton. As it moved northeast into the Mark Twain National Forest, satellite imagery revealed an intermittent track of uprooted trees extending to near the Eleven Point River at Turners Mill, where the tornado is presumed to have lifted.						
EF2	Old Jamestown, MO to western Alton, IL	St. Louis (MO), St. Charles (MO), Madison (IL)	MO, IL	38.8156°N 90.321°W	02:38–02:53	11.04 mi (17.77 km)	1,320 yd (1,210 m)
EF2	This large, strong tornado formed as the Chesterfield-Florissant EF2 tornado was dissipating and immediately caused damage to several homes. The tornado continued northeast, crossing the Missouri River and passing just northwest of West Alton, where it downed a metal truss tower. It then crossed the Mississippi River into Illinois, producing weak damage on the west side of Alton before dissipating.						
EF1	Valmeyer to NW of Floraville	Monroe, St. Clair	IL	38.2991°N 90.3107°W	02:52–03:10	14.67 mi (23.61 km)	275 yd (251 m)
EF1	Several houses had roof and siding damage in Valmeyer and Waterloo from this EF1 tornado.						
EF1	NW of Patmos	Hempstead	AR	33.5242°N 93.6464°W	03:09–03:28	8.58 mi (13.81 km)	525 yd (480 m)
EF1	This tornado initially caused tree damage and roofing damage to several homes as it moved northeast. It intensified near AR 29 where a camper and cattle trailer were thrown about 100 yd (91 m) and a mobile home was completely destroyed, injuring two residents. The tornado continued east-northeast, damaging another home's roof and uprooting trees before lifting.						
EF3	SW of Cushman to Cave City to N of Corning	Independence, Sharp, Lawrence, Randolph, Clay	AR	35.8395°N 91.7831°W	03:16–04:51	81.84 mi (131.71 km)	700 yd (640 m)
EF3	3 deaths – See article on this tornado – At least five people were injured.						
EF2	NNE of Gum Springs to S of Dover	Clark, Dallas, Hot Spring	AR	34.0729°N 93.0548°W	03:17–03:43	21.56 mi (34.70 km)	150 yd (140 m)
EF2	This strong tornado touched down near Gum Springs, causing mostly tree damage. However, a newly built shop near the community of Harrison was destroyed at mid-range EF2 intensity, before crossing into Hot Spring County, dissipating south of Dover.						
EF3	NNE of Garwood to Des Arc to N of Saco	Reynolds, Wayne, Iron, Madison	MO	37.1113°N 90.851°W	03:20–03:57	29.85 mi (48.04 km)	1,525 yd (1,394 m)
EF3	3 deaths — Several homes were heavily damaged or destroyed in Des Arc, including multiple poorly anchored homes that were leveled or shifted off their foundations. At least one business was also damaged, and many trees were snapped or uprooted. Four people were injured. Des Arc would be hit by an EF2 tornado just two months later on May 16.						
EF1	Northeastern O'Fallon to S of St. Jacob	St. Clair, Madison	IL	38.6129°N 89.8779°W	03:28–03:33	6.81 mi (10.96 km)	450 yd (410 m)
EF1	This tornado caused severe damage in a trailer park shortly after touching down. Minor damage to trees and outbuildings occurred elsewhere along the path.						
EF3	NE of Eastwood to northern Leeper to S of Patterson	Carter, Wayne	MO	36.91°N 91.02°W	03:28–03:56	30.6 mi (49.2 km)	325 yd (297 m)
EF3	2 deaths – See section on this tornado						
EF1	Northern Bethesda	Independence	AR	35.7897°N 91.8407°W	03:28–03:32	3.61 mi (5.81 km)	100 yd (91 m)
EF1	This tornado touched down just to the east of the White River, where it caused minor roof damage to a house and destroyed a shed. The tornado continued off towards the northeast, passing mostly farmland before lifting.						
EF2	Mascoutah to eastern Trenton	St. Clair, Clinton	IL	38.4972°N 89.8071°W	03:33–03:38	11.01 mi (17.72 km)	700 yd (640 m)
EF2	This strong tornado began in Mascoutah, causing roof damage to multiple homes and a local school, along with damage to power poles and outbuildings. Moving northeast, it damaged a grain elevator and additional farm outbuildings. Near the Madison–Clinton county line, farm outbuildings were destroyed, and homes sustained heavy roof and window damage. After crossing into Clinton County, a home had significant roof damage, with more residential and outbuilding damage along the path. In eastern Trenton, most damage was limited to minor roof impacts, though one business had significant siding and air conditioning unit damage						
EF2	NW of Rosston to SE of Bluff City	Nevada, Ouachita	AR	33.62°N 93.3252°W	03:55–04:09	14.83 mi (23.87 km)	1,263 yd (1,155 m)
EF2	This low-end EF2 tornado touched down, causing tree damage and tearing roof panels off barns and outbuildings as it moved northeast. It intensified near AR 299, snapping and uprooting numerous trees, some of which fell on homes. The tornado continued east-northeast, causing additional tree damage before lifting in White Oak Lake State Park.						
EF1	SW of Hagarstown to northwestern Vandalia to NW of Brownstown	Fayette	IL	38.9324°N 89.188°W	04:11–04:23	13.39 mi (21.55 km)	400 yd (370 m)
EF1	This tornado moved through western Vandalia where EF0 damage occurred to trees and houses. EF1 damage occurred to the northeast, where several trees were uprooted.						
EF3	NW of Burbank to NE of Hurricane	Wayne, Madison, Bollinger	MO	37.16°N 90.39°W	04:15–04:40	28.64 mi (46.09 km)	500 yd (460 m)
EF3	1 death – This long-tracked, intense tornado began northeast near Greenville, causing extreme tree damage with thousands of trees snapped or uprooted. It struck the River Valley Campground near the Castor River, killing one person and severely injuring another. Near the campground, a home lost its roof and most exterior walls, several vehicles were thrown 50 ft (15 m) to 100 ft (30 m), and another home sustained heavy damage. Numerous outbuildings were destroyed, and a wooden power pole was snapped. In Bollinger County, thousands more trees were snapped or uprooted, two homes had major damage, over a dozen sustained minor damage, a barn lost its roof, and another wooden power pole was destroyed.						
EF4	W of Nuckles to SSW of Tuckerman	Independence, Jackson	AR	35.5705°N 91.4227°W	04:13–04:36	18.62 mi (29.97 km)	1,760 yd (1,610 m)
EF4	See section on this tornado – Two people were injured.						
EF2	NW of Belzoni to E of Greenwood	Humphreys, Leflore, Holmes, Carroll	MS	33.2106°N 90.5327°W	04:14–05:07	35.2 mi (56.6 km)	1,320 yd (1,210 m)
EF2	This long-tracked, large, strong tornado began northwest of Belzoni, snapping power poles and damaging a home before continuing northeast, where it caused additional tree damage and damaged a trailer. As it moved through Mayday, it snapped more power poles and damaged a metal building before crossing the Yazoo River and destroying multiple mobile homes south of Greenwood. Several well-built homes sustained roof damage, trees were uprooted, and a tree was blown onto a home. The tornado continued causing structural and tree damage before dissipating.						
EF2	SW of Precinct, MO to eastern Perryville, MO to Leanderville, IL	Bollinger (MO), Perry (MO), Randolph (IL)	MO, IL	37.5423°N 90.0433°W	04:25–04:55	33.11 mi (53.29 km)	800 yd (730 m)
EF2	This long-tracked, strong tornado moved northeast through Bollinger County, destroying a carport and shed, tearing the roof off a barn along Route 51, and causing widespread tree damage. It continued toward Perryville, damaging trees and barns before producing EF2 damage to several homes. At the Perryville Middle and High School complex, three buildings were damaged, including one with exterior walls on the top floor knocked in and two with extensive roof damage. Two nearby houses lost large portions of their roofs. As it moved northeast out of town toward the Mississippi River, it caused additional significant roof damage to homes, damaged several barns, and downed more trees. The tornado crossed the Mississippi River into Illinois, where most damage was to trees, though a few outbuildings sustained significant roof damage. The tornado dissipated in Leanderville.						
EF3	WNW of Harviell to northern Poplar Bluff to NW of Rombauer	Butler	MO	36.7229°N 90.5729°W	04:27–04:47	17.92 mi (28.84 km)	350 yd (320 m)
EF3	1 death – See section on this tornado – 3 people were injured.						
EF0	Southern Yorkville	Kendall	IL	41.6148°N 88.4439°W	04:39–04:43	3.64 mi (5.86 km)	125 yd (114 m)
EF0	This tornado touched down near IL 47 in Yorkville, damaging homes by removing shingles, siding, fascia trim, and heavily damaging a fence. It continued east-northeast, causing additional tree and roof damage before dissipating, with straight-line winds continuing beyond its path.						
EF1	E of Wright	Jefferson	AR	34.43°N 92.01°W	04:43–04:46	0.87 mi (1.40 km)	50 yd (46 m)
EF1	This brief tornado in northern Jefferson County damaged trees, destroyed a mobile home, and damaged a few outbuildings before dissipating.						
EF1	SE of Stewardson	Shelby	IL	39.23°N 88.65°W	04:47–04:52	5.1 mi (8.2 km)	75 yd (69 m)
EF1	As it touched down, this tornado uprooted a hardwood tree and peeled off part of a farm building's roof. It then moved northeast, collapsing the walls of a large farm building and scattering debris nearly a mile away before damaging another small farm building and uprooting trees on a nearby property.						
EF1	NNE of Rombauer to Puxico	Stoddard	MO	36.9094°N 90.2493°W	04:50–04:57	6.12 mi (9.85 km)	25 yd (23 m)
EF1	An outbuilding was severely damaged southwest of Puxico. The tornado then moved through town, damaging the roofs, fascia, and gutters of a few homes.						
EF1	N of Strasburg to S of Windsor	Shelby	IL	39.38°N 88.61°W	04:50–04:52	2.33 mi (3.75 km)	100 yd (91 m)
EF1	Two grain bins and a small shed were destroyed, and a 52x76-foot pole barn was tossed. Multiple trees and over half a dozen power poles were snapped.						
EF2	N of Augusta to WSW of Tupelo	Woodruff	AR	35.336°N 91.3679°W	04:50–04:55	5.09 mi (8.19 km)	200 yd (180 m)
EF2	This strong, fast-moving tornado began southwest of AR 33, causing tree damage and severely damaging a barn. It continued northeast, damaging wooden power lines near Fitzhugh and primarily affecting trees along its path before dissipating.						
EF2	E of Knobel to SW of McDougal	Clay	AR	36.3207°N 90.5793°W	04:53–05:02	9.88 mi (15.90 km)	125 yd (114 m)
EF2	This significant tornado developed east of Knobel, snapping power poles along AR 90 before intensifying near the Walnut Grove community. It destroyed several outbuildings, snapped multiple wooden power poles along AR 135, and overturned heavy farm machinery. The tornado gradually weakened as it moved northeast, causing sporadic tree damage before lifting.						
EF1	W of Lovington to SW of Hammond	Moultrie	IL	39.72°N 88.68°W	04:57–05:03	4.92 mi (7.92 km)	150 yd (140 m)
EF1	Two outbuildings were destroyed, and trees and power lines were downed.						
EF2	Hammond to SSW of Ivesdale	Moultrie, Piatt	IL	39.75°N 88.61°W	05:01–05:14	12.56 mi (20.21 km)	150 yd (140 m)
EF2	This low-end EF2 tornado touched down near US 36 south of Hammond before moving into town, damaging numerous trees and buildings. Its peak intensity occurred just north of town, where a farm outbuilding was destroyed, debris was scattered, and a cell tower was blown down before the tornado continued northeast, damaging additional outbuildings.						
EF0	NW of Bono	Craighead	AR	35.9239°N 90.8564°W	05:03–05:05	1.4 mi (2.3 km)	50 yd (46 m)
EF0	This weak tornado caused some tree damage and snapped a pole.						
EF2	Eastern Neoga to NW of Lerna	Cumberland, Coles	IL	39.31°N 88.44°W	05:03–05:18	12.88 mi (20.73 km)	300 yd (270 m)
EF2	In Neoga, this tornado damaged the roof of a home along with two schools. Moving northeastward, it then damaged a grain bin and scattered the debris in a field as it crossed I-57 at the US 45 exit. Two semi-truckers on the interstate were injured. After snapping power poles and damaging the roof of an outbuilding, the tornado strengthened to EF2 intensity and destroyed seven grain bins and snapped more power poles, scattering the debris to the northeast. It then caused some additional tree and power pole damage before dissipating.						
EF1	N of Redd to Aid to ENE of Acorn Ridge	Stoddard	MO	36.8759°N 90.0479°W	05:05–05:10	4.62 mi (7.44 km)	50 yd (46 m)
EF1	This tornado impacted Aid, damaging the roof and entrance of a church and destroying or damaging several farm outbuildings along its path. The tornado lifted shortly after crossing into open farmland.						
EF0	Eastern Bartlett to Hanover Park	DuPage	IL	41.9757°N 88.1547°W	05:05–05:06	0.78 mi (1.26 km)	50 yd (46 m)
EF0	This brief, weak tornado caused mainly tree and fence damage; it also caused slight roof damage to homes.						
EF1	SW of Dorans	Coles	IL	39.535°N 88.38°W	05:10–05:11	0.6 mi (0.97 km)	75 yd (69 m)
EF1	Eleven power poles were snapped.						
EF2	NNW of Vergennes to St. Johns to ENE of Sunfield	Jackson, Perry	IL	37.9183°N 89.3612°W	05:10–05:23	15.16 mi (24.40 km)	250 yd (230 m)
EF2	This strong tornado began in Jackson County before quickly moving into Perry County, damaging around 50 homes across the county and leaving five uninhabitable in the St. Johns community. It collapsed a metal building in an industrial park in western Du Quoin, broke numerous wooden power poles, and caused significant tree damage. The tornado blew out windows of a historic church, toppled gravestones in a cemetery, and snapped tree trunks before dissipating.						
EF2	SSW of Walcott to Paragould	Craighead, Greene	AR	35.9601°N 90.6996°W	05:16–05:34	13.76 mi (22.14 km)	150 yd (140 m)
EF2	This strong tornado touched down in northern Craighead County, snapping and uprooting trees while also doing minor damage to a few homes. The tornado then moved through inaccessible dense forest, with some tree damage discovered via high-resolution satellite imagery. The tornado then exited the forest and began uprooting trees before intensifying and causing significant roof damage in the Club View Estates and The Enclave neighborhoods to the southwest of Paragould. Several homes suffered major structural damage, including collapsed walls and missing second floors, with additional homes losing roofs and experiencing brick damage as the tornado moved northeast. It continued through the western portion of Paragould, causing tree damage and minor damage to an assisted living building before crossing US 49/AR 1 and intensifying. The tornado caused further home and tree damage before damaging multiple metal buildings near US 412B before dissipating. Four people were injured.						
EF2	E of Bell City to W of Oran	Stoddard, Scott	MO	37.0264°N 89.7649°W	05:17–05:25	6.43 mi (10.35 km)	100 yd (91 m)
EF2	This low-end EF2 tornado caused roof damage to two homes, destroyed multiple outbuildings, and snapped several power poles as it moved northeast. It continued through open fields, flipping irrigation pivots and damaging grain silos and shops before dissipating.						
EF2	N of North Carrollton to Elliott to N of Gore Springs	Carroll, Montgomery, Grenada	MS	33.5642°N 89.9216°W	05:18–05:53	24.41 mi (39.28 km)	880 yd (800 m)
EF2	This high-end EF2 tornado began by damaging softwood trees before intensifying as it moved northeast, causing roof damage to a home and snapping numerous trees. As it crossed MS 17, the tornado grew in size and strength, snapping power poles and trees while damaging another home's roof. It continued northeast, overturning a tractor-trailer on I-55, destroying a tractor shed, and throwing a truck 30 yd (27 m). Entering Montgomery County, it caused more roof and tree damage before reaching Grenada County, where it destroyed a mobile home and heavily damaged a house and a large metal building in Elliott. The tornado continued northeast, snapping trees and power poles as it crossed multiple roads before finally lifting. Three people were injured.						
EF0	N of Waldenburg	Poinsett	AR	35.6178°N 90.9493°W	05:23–05:26	2.82 mi (4.54 km)	50 yd (46 m)
EF0	This weak tornado caused mainly mild tree damage, though a part of the path could not be accessed.						
EF1	W of Sellers to N of Gifford	Champaign	IL	40.18°N 88.11°W	05:40–05:52	13.72 mi (22.08 km)	150 yd (140 m)
EF1	The tornado touched down west of Sellars, primarily causing tree damage before damaging several outbuildings along its path. As it moved north-northeast, it caused shingle damage to multiple homes on the northwest edge of Gifford before lifting in a forest preserve.						
EF1	Southeastern Paris	Edgar	IL	39.58°N 87.71°W	05:50–05:55	6.44 mi (10.36 km)	425 yd (389 m)
EF1	This tornado touched down and immediately leveled an outbuilding and snapped a tree, which fell onto a home. The tornado then proceeded toward the southeast part of Paris, where it damaged several homes, mobile homes, and trees. It continued northeast, producing periodic damage before it dissipated on the north side of a country club.						
EF2	N of Senath to Kennett to WSW of Homestown	Dunklin, Pemiscot	MO	36.1837°N 90.1626°W	05:56–06:21	19.42 mi (31.25 km)	550 yd (500 m)
EF2	This strong tornado began along Route A, overturning irrigation pivots, downing power poles, and snapping trees southwest of Kennett. It caused roof damage to multiple homes and businesses north of US 412, with additional damage to power poles and a motel near the intersection of US 412 and Route 25. As it moved northeast, more irrigation pivots were overturned, a small barn was destroyed, and windows were blown out of a home. The tornado then intensified again, snapping multiple concrete electrical poles before continuing northeast and eventually lifting near Homestown.						

=== March 15 event ===
List of confirmed tornadoes – Saturday, March 15, 2025
EF#	Location	County / Parish	State	Start Coord.	Time (UTC)	Path length	Max width
EF1	E of Morehouse to southern Sikeston	New Madrid	MO	36.8366°N 89.6383°W	06:03–06:07	4.51 mi (7.26 km)	50 yd (46 m)
EF1	This tornado touched down southwest of Sikeston, damaging barns and downing power poles before moving east-northeast into town. It caused roof damage to apartment buildings, a shopping center, a fast-food restaurant, and a nursing home near US 61. The tornado then damaged several homes before dissipating on the southeastern side of town. The tornado's track was just south of a low-end EF3 tornado that struck Sikeston in May 2024.						
EF1	Western Cedar Lake	Lake	IN	41.3698°N 87.4715°W	06:12–06:13	0.93 mi (1.50 km)	200 yd (180 m)
EF1	This low-end EF1 tornado moved through western portions of Cedar Lake, uprooting trees, damaging homes, and ripping part of a roof off a two-story house. It continued north, causing additional tree damage before dissipating, with a trampoline found wrapped around a telephone pole along its path.						
EF1	Mecca	Parke	IN	39.7563°N 87.3108°W	06:14–06:16	2.66 mi (4.28 km)	75 yd (69 m)
EF1	This high-end EF1 tornado began west of Mecca, causing sporadic tree damage in rural wood and farmland. It later completely destroyed a small garage and mostly destroyed a 150-year-old barn. It continued to cause tree and pole building damage before moving onto rural farmland and dissipating shortly thereafter.						
EF2	W of Vienna to Bloomfield to ESE of New Burnside	Johnson	IL	37.4075°N 88.9443°W	06:15–06:31	15.63 mi (25.15 km)	150 yd (140 m)
EF2	This low-end EF2 tornado began west of Vienna, damaging homes and outbuildings and uprooting trees as it crossed IL 146. It intensified near US 45 and I-24, nearly destroying manufactured homes and breaking wooden power poles before continuing northeast, causing additional roof and tree damage. The tornado weakened east of Ozark before lifting near the Johnson-Pope county line.						
EF0	Eastern Schererville to northern Merrillville	Lake	IN	41.4693°N 87.4173°W	06:19–06:24	4.94 mi (7.95 km)	200 yd (180 m)
EF0	Trees were uprooted, and minor roof damage was inflicted to homes.						
EF1	E of Derma to Vardaman to NNW of Pyland	Calhoun, Chickasaw	MS	33.8505°N 89.2494°W	06:25–06:38	8.19 mi (13.18 km)	300 yd (270 m)
EF1	This tornado touched down and rapidly intensified, uprooting trees and causing minor roof and outbuilding damage along MS 8. As it moved through Vardaman, it uprooted trees, damaged roofs, and tore the metal roof off an elementary school building. The tornado continued into Chickasaw County, snapping more trees before lifting.						
EF2	E of Fort Branch to Oakland City to SSW of Indian Springs	Gibson, Pike, Daviess, Martin	IN	38.2103°N 87.5483°W	07:53–08:44	57.49 mi (92.52 km)	400 yd (370 m)
EF2	This long-tracked tornado first touched down southwest of Oakland City before moving northeastward through the city. Along the beginning portion of the path, several mobile homes and outbuildings were heavily damaged or destroyed, and trees and power poles were snapped. A gas station canopy was also damaged. The tornado then continued northeastward and passed just east of Algiers, causing minor damage to homes and downing electrical transmission lines. The tornado continued northeast, causing minor damage to outbuildings, a home, and trees before crossing the East Fork White River into Daviess County. A farm sustained the most significant damage of the tornado, with winds around 100 mph (160 km/h) damaging metal outbuildings, throwing a 2x4 through the windshield of a semi-truck, and completely destroying and tearing apart two large grain bins and throwing their debris at least a mile northeast.						
EF1	West Baden Springs to Orleans	Orange	IN	38.5632°N 86.6092°W	08:45–08:53	11.02 mi (17.73 km)	50 yd (46 m)
EF1	This high-end EF1 tornado touched down in West Baden Springs, snapping trees, downing power lines, and causing minor home damage before moving northeast. It intensified east of town, causing extensive roof damage to a residence, flipping an unanchored mobile home, and collapsing a metal barn. The tornado continued through rural Orange County and a portion of the Hoosier National Forest, damaging homes, barns, trees, and completely destroying a pole barn garage. It then moved into Orleans, snapping trees, damaging a church roof, and tearing the roof off a pole barn residence before lifting.						
EF0	SW of Silverville to W of Oolitic	Lawrence	IN	38.8499°N 86.6756°W	08:53–08:59	6.24 mi (10.04 km)	100 yd (91 m)
EF0	This weak, intermittent tornado caused sporadic damage, destroying an old shed, damaging a barn roof, and uprooting trees.						
EF0	ENE of Avoca to Needmore	Lawrence	IN	38.9133°N 86.5386°W	09:01–09:02	0.97 mi (1.56 km)	25 yd (23 m)
EF0	This short-lived tornado caused significant damage, destroying a shed, damaging a home's porch and roof, and partially blowing out a garage's cinder block foundation.						
EF1	SSE of Brownstown	Jackson	IN	38.8033°N 86.0297°W	09:14–09:17	2.22 mi (3.57 km)	50 yd (46 m)
EF1	A mobile home had its roof torn off, and its walls collapsed.						
EF0	NE of Saulsbury to NW of Middleton	Hardeman	TN	35.0966°N 89.0021°W	12:56–13:02	2.67 mi (4.30 km)	50 yd (46 m)
EF0	Minor tree damage occurred.						
EF2	N of Mayersville to E of Delta City	Issaquena, Sharkey	MS	32.9205°N 91.0464°W	15:22–15:49	19.8 mi (31.9 km)	1,580 yd (1,440 m)
EF2	This large tornado began near the Mississippi River north of Mayersville, snapping trees and power poles and damaging a home's roof. It intensified as it moved northeast, destroying a mobile home, leveling a barn, and overturning farm pivots. Near Grace, it caused the most severe damage, collapsing the second story of a home, removing roofs, and snapping dozens of power poles. The tornado continued toward Nitta Yuma and Delta City, causing sporadic tree and structural damage before dissipating.						
EF4	NE of Kentwood, LA to Carson, MS	Tangipahoa (LA), Pike (MS), Walthall (MS), Marion (MS), Jefferson Davis (MS), Covington (MS)	LA, MS	30.9576°N 90.4667°W	17:17–18:39	67.16 mi (108.08 km)	1,400 yd (1,300 m)
EF4	6 deaths – See article on this tornado – 14 people were injured.						
EF1	NNW of Van Vleet	Chickasaw	MS	33.9857°N 88.917°W	17:27–17:33	2.96 mi (4.76 km)	150 yd (140 m)
EF1	This tornado began on MS 32, causing a car to spin off the state highway. The tornado then moved northeast through a heavily forested area, snapping pine trees and downing power lines before lifting.						
EF0	Eastern Mendenhall	Simpson	MS	31.9618°N 89.8603°W	17:47–17:48	0.41 mi (0.66 km)	100 yd (91 m)
EF0	A weak tornado downed several pine trees near a church and caused minor damage to fencing and vegetation.						
EF0	NE of New Wren	Monroe	MS	33.9719°N 88.5998°W	18:16–18:18	2.01 mi (3.23 km)	50 yd (46 m)
EF0	Minor tree damage was noted.						
EF3	SW of Tylertown to W of Goss	Walthall, Marion	MS	31.1161°N 90.1937°W	18:24–18:54	26.05 mi (41.92 km)	880 yd (800 m)
EF3	1 death – See section on this tornado – Two people were injured.						
EF0	S of Newton	Newton	MS	32.2767°N 89.1952°W	18:32–18:36	3.5 mi (5.6 km)	75 yd (69 m)
EF0	This weak tornado uprooted trees and downed tree limbs. A house sustained minor damage to its exterior.						
EF1	NE of Newton	Newton	MS	32.3532°N 89.0895°W	18:41–18:51	6.7 mi (10.8 km)	300 yd (270 m)
EF1	Several trees were snapped or uprooted. Two homes and a carport sustained generally minor structural damage.						
EF2	NNE of Collins to NE of Taylorsville	Covington, Smith	MS	31.711°N 89.5121°W	18:54–19:17	16.3 mi (26.2 km)	750 yd (690 m)
EF2	This strong tornado touched down west of Hopewell, damaging trees, homes, and destroying a barn before moving northeast, where it destroyed multiple mobile homes along its path. Near Hot Coffee, several mobile homes were completely destroyed, including one thrown into a ravine, though parked vehicles nearby remained mostly unmoved. The tornado continued through rural areas, flattening forests and removing the roof from a brick home before severely impacting a mobile home community where most residents had evacuated due to warnings. It then moved into Smith County, where a couple unintentionally rode out the storm in their vehicle as their home lost part of its roof and a wall. The tornado caused widespread damage in Taylorsville, destroying homes, businesses, and a high school sports complex before weakening and dissipating. Eleven people were injured.						
EF2	NNE of Bassfield to W of Collins	Jefferson Davis, Covington	MS	31.5225°N 89.7298°W	19:11–19:30	12.7 mi (20.4 km)	600 yd (550 m)
EF2	This strong tornado caused widespread tree damage as it moved northeast through eastern Jefferson Davis County. It destroyed multiple commercial chicken houses and damaged buildings at a Methodist Church complex in Covington County. It also crossed the end of the damage path of the long-tracked EF4 tornado. The tornado continued downing trees and causing light to moderate damage to homes and outbuildings before dissipating.						
EF1	S of Lexington	Lauderdale	AL	34.9439°N 87.3985°W	19:21–19:25	2.29 mi (3.69 km)	63 yd (58 m)
EF1	This tornado touched down in a field before moving northeast, damaging a two-car garage, shifting it off its foundation, and snapping several large cedar trees. It continued uprooting trees, damaging fences, and destroying an outdoor metal shed, scattering debris across multiple properties. The tornado also caused roof damage to a home, damaged a vehicle, and continued snapping and uprooting trees before lifting.						
EF1	E of Montrose	Jasper	MS	32.0939°N 89.1908°W	19:38–19:50	6.8 mi (10.9 km)	300 yd (270 m)
EF1	This tornado damaged trees.						
EF2	SSE of Bassfield to N of Seminary	Marion, Jefferson Davis, Covington	MS	31.4°N 89.6829°W	20:03–20:24	18.3 mi (29.5 km)	880 yd (800 m)
EF2	1 death – This large, high-end EF2 tornado began in northeastern Marion county, snapping trees, damaging a home, and destroying a barn before intensifying as it entered Jefferson Davis county, where two mobile homes were destroyed. It remained strong as it moved through the Melba community, damaging additional homes and destroying another mobile home before rolling an RV in southern Covington county. The tornado caused significant roof damage to multiple homes and damaged several outbuildings before reaching US 49, where two mobile homes were destroyed, resulting in one fatality and one additional injury. A community center sustained roof damage before the tornado weakened and lifted near Okatoma Creek.						
EF1	SE of Pleasant Ridge to ESE of Gordo	Greene, Pickens, Tuscaloosa	AL	32.9887°N 88.07°W	20:08–20:43	26.46 mi (42.58 km)	1,200 yd (1,100 m)
EF1	This large, long-tracked, low-end EF1 tornado touched down in Greene County, initially causing tree damage and impacting a mobile home. It continued northeast, uprooting and snapping numerous trees as it passed through rural areas and into Pickens County, where it re-intensified and caused more concentrated tree damage. The tornado then crossed into Tuscaloosa County, bringing down additional trees before weakening and lifting just west of its final location.						
EF1	ESE of Eagleville to NW of Bell Buckle	Bedford, Rutherford	TN	35.6716°N 86.5328°W	20:22–20:26	4.48 mi (7.21 km)	300 yd (270 m)
EF1	This tornado touched down in northwest Bedford County, damaging or destroying several outbuildings and barns before causing minor home damage as it moved east-northeast. It continued into southwestern Rutherford County, downing trees and damaging additional outbuildings before lifting just west of US 231.						
EF1	NNE of Seminary	Covington, Jones	MS	31.6358°N 89.446°W	20:27–20:36	6.8 mi (10.9 km)	400 yd (370 m)
EF1	Several trees were snapped or uprooted.						
EF1	N of Soso	Jasper	MS	31.8121°N 89.2699°W	20:46–20:49	2.5 mi (4.0 km)	300 yd (270 m)
EF1	Several trees were snapped or uprooted.						
EF1	N of Northport to SE of Windham Springs	Tuscaloosa	AL	33.3475°N 87.6089°W	21:00–21:14	11.54 mi (18.57 km)	600 yd (550 m)
EF1	This tornado touched down near a metal building that lost part of its roof, then moved across Lake Tuscaloosa and into a residential area where multiple trees were snapped or uprooted. The most significant damage occurred where numerous pine trees were downed, some falling onto structures. The tornado weakened as it continued northeast and lifted in a wooded area.						
EF2	Paulding to NW of Wautubbee	Jasper, Clarke	MS	32.0196°N 89.0554°W	21:09–21:28	13 mi (21 km)	300 yd (270 m)
EF2	This strong tornado began southwest of Paulding, causing tree damage and peeling tin off a porch cover before crossing MS 503, where it snapped trees and damaged a shed and home. As it moved northeast into the Lake Eddins area, it caused its most significant damage, snapping numerous trees, destroying a four-car garage, collapsing a boathouse, and damaging several home roofs. The tornado weakened as it continued northeast, snapping large tree limbs and causing sporadic tree damage as it crossed into Clarke County. It continued causing sporadic tree damage as it crossed I-59 before dissipating.						
EF2	S of Windham Springs to southern Cordova to NNW of Empire	Tuscaloosa, Walker	AL	33.4571°N 87.5051°W	21:12–21:55	39.48 mi (63.54 km)	1,000 yd (910 m)
EF2	This large, long-tracked tornado touched down as the Northport EF1 tornado was dissipating. It first inflicted light tree damage and minor structural impacts to a small farm building. As it moved northeast, it caused increasing damage in parts of Walker County, including uprooted trees, roof damage to homes, and broken windows. The most serious and widespread damage occurred near Sipsey, where numerous trees were snapped, homes were damaged or lost portions of their roofs, and a mobile home was destroyed. The tornado then weakened gradually before lifting just south of the Cullman County line. The track of this tornado closely followed the EF3 and EF4 tornadoes that moved through Cordova on April 27, 2011.						
EF1	SW of Madisonville to SE of Covington	St. Tammany	LA	30.3816°N 90.1689°W	21:17–21:28	7.55 mi (12.15 km)	20 yd (18 m)
EF1	A waterspout developed over Lake Pontchartrain before moving ashore near Madisonville. It mainly produced tree damage along its path, dropping tree limbs onto homes and crossing the Bogue Falaya River three times.						
EF2	ENE of Aliceville to NNE of Gordo	Pickens	AL	33.1499°N 88.0569°W	21:32–21:58	21.56 mi (34.70 km)	950 yd (870 m)
EF2	This large, low-end EF2 tornado began in a wooded area and quickly intensified, snapping numerous trees as it moved northeast. Several chicken houses were destroyed, a manufactured home was ripped off its anchoring, and widespread damage continued as it tracked through mostly rural land. Several homes sustained significant roof damage along the path as well. The tornado gradually weakened and lifted after causing additional structural and tree damage near the end of its track.						
EF1	E of Enterprise to SE of Meridian	Clarke, Lauderdale	MS	32.176°N 88.7745°W	21:33–21:51	13.4 mi (21.6 km)	400 yd (370 m)
EF1	This tornado touched down on MS 514, uprooting softwood trees and damaging the roofs of several homes, a light post, and a shed. As it moved northeast, it rolled a mobile home onto its roof, causing heavy damage, and inflicted minor roof damage to a nearby home while snapping more trees. The tornado weakened as it continued, causing minor tree damage before crossing into Lauderdale County where it damaged more home roofs and continued uprooting trees. It caused additional roof damage before dissipating shortly after.						
EF2	NW of Bellamy	Sumter	AL	32.4847°N 88.2078°W	22:20–22:26	3.32 mi (5.34 km)	650 yd (590 m)
EF2	Hundreds of trees were snapped by this strong tornado that remained over forested areas.						
EF0	E of Gallion to S of Morgan Springs	Hale, Perry	AL	32.4976°N 87.6612°W	23:39–00:05	21.61 mi (34.78 km)	700 yd (640 m)
EF0	This weak tornado snapped or uprooted trees.						
EF0	N of Active to S of Brierfield	Bibb	AL	32.9063°N 86.9776°W	00:39–00:54	7.63 mi (12.28 km)	75 yd (69 m)
EF0	Trees were snapped.						
EF1	Calera	Chilton, Shelby	AL	33.066°N 86.7608°W	00:57–01:11	7.47 mi (12.02 km)	250 yd (230 m)
EF1	This tornado moved through much of Calera, primarily damaging trees. It also damaged several mobile homes, rolled or tossed campers at a dealership near US 31 and I-65, and then weakened before lifting near a limestone quarry.						
EF1	Eastern Montevallo	Shelby	AL	33.0875°N 86.8291°W	01:00–01:07	2.55 mi (4.10 km)	150 yd (140 m)
EF1	Several trees were snapped or uprooted.						
EF1	ENE of Citronelle	Mobile, Washington	AL	31.1139°N 88.1775°W	01:20–01:30	6.26 mi (10.07 km)	200 yd (180 m)
EF1	This EF1 tornado caused tree damage near its touchdown point and likely reached peak intensity and width while moving through a forested area where satellite imagery showed extensive tree snaps and uproots. It weakened as it approached an outbuilding that lost its roof and walls, then continued causing additional tree damage before lifting.						
EF2	Winterboro to S of Mardisville	Talladega	AL	33.3194°N 86.2005°W	01:42–01:49	3.63 mi (5.84 km)	500 yd (460 m)
EF2	1 death — This strong tornado touched down near Winterboro High School, damaging sports facilities before intensifying and lifting a school bus into the school's gymnasium, causing significant structural collapse. It continued northeast, snapping trees, damaging homes, and destroying a single-wide manufactured home, resulting in a fatality and an injury. The tornado weakened as it moved further northeast, causing minor roof damage to homes and outbuildings before lifting.						
EF1	S of Carlton to SSW of Gainestown	Clarke, Monroe	AL	31.2915°N 87.861°W	01:48–02:05	13.9 mi (22.4 km)	240 yd (220 m)
EF1	This tornado began south of Carlton, where high-resolution satellite imagery revealed its peak intensity as it wiped out a large portion of forest. It continued northeast with a narrow but continuous path of tree damage, mostly in the form of snapped and uprooted treetops, particularly along the Alabama River. One building sustained damage, where part of its metal roof was removed.						
EF3	S of Plantersville to western Clanton	Dallas, Autauga, Chilton	AL	32.5971°N 86.9377°W	01:50–02:20	24.33 mi (39.16 km)	1,000 yd (910 m)
EF3	2 deaths – See section on this tornado – 2 people were injured.						
EF0	NE of Barlow Bend	Clarke	AL	31.4673°N 87.6035°W	02:10–02:11	1.43 mi (2.30 km)	200 yd (180 m)
EF0	A tornado path was identified through high-resolution satellite imagery in May 2025, revealing continuous tree damage. The tornado primarily snapped or uprooted trees.						
EF1	NW of Dollar to ESE of Weogufka	Coosa	AL	32.909°N 86.4495°W	02:33–02:50	12.02 mi (19.34 km)	200 yd (180 m)
EF1	A double-wide manufactured home and farm outbuildings were destroyed. Numerous trees were snapped or uprooted.						
EF1	W of Sudie to eastern Dallas to S of Roxana	Paulding	GA	33.856°N 84.876°W	03:41–03:53	11.64 mi (18.73 km)	200 yd (180 m)
EF1	This high-end EF1 tornado touched down in central Paulding County, initially downing trees and destroying an outbuilding near Pace Creek Lake. It intensified as it moved northeast, causing tree and power line damage, toppling trees onto homes, and damaging a gas station and grocery store roof near US 278. The tornado continued through New Hope, uprooting trees, destroying a shed, and damaging multiple homes before weakening and lifting. In total, approximately 15 structures were damaged along its path.						
EF3	W of Jackson's Gap to Daviston	Tallapoosa	AL	32.8695°N 85.8778°W	03:48–04:12	20.45 mi (32.91 km)	800 yd (730 m)
EF3	This intense tornado began by causing extensive tree damage and minor roof damage to homes before crossing US 280, where businesses sustained minor structural damage. It intensified as it moved northeast, destroying a single-wide manufactured home and snapping numerous trees. The tornado reached peak strength in a wooded area where another manufactured home was destroyed, with debris scattered over a wide area. It continued to produce widespread tree damage, impacting Horseshoe Bend National Military Park, where outbuildings and an exhibit pavilion were damaged. The tornado weakened as it moved through Daviston, causing additional tree damage and minor structural damage before dissipating.						
EF2	S of Troy to W of Perote	Pike, Bullock	AL	31.7383°N 85.9805°W	04:02–04:28	21.31 mi (34.30 km)	1,400 yd (1,300 m)
EF2	This large, strong tornado touched down in Pike County just south of Troy, initially snapping branches from the trees in the area and causing significant roof damage to a parks and recreation building. Moving northeast just to the east of Troy, the tornado intensified to EF1 strength, snapping and uprooting trees and also causing significant damage to a service station canopy. The tornado continued to intensify, reaching its peak strength of high-end EF2 as it rendered a home uninhabitable. The tornado maintained its intensity as it continued to cause widespread tree damage as it moved northeast. The tornado weakened as it continued through Pike County, although one more area of low-end EF2 damage occurred where a metal truss tower collapsed. It continued to weaken and narrow as it moved into Bullock County before lifting.						
EF0	NW of Cusseta	Chambers	AL	32.7831°N 85.381°W	04:59–05:03	3.8 mi (6.1 km)	100 yd (91 m)
EF0	Several pine trees were uprooted.						

=== March 16 event ===
List of confirmed tornadoes – Sunday, March 16, 2025
EF#	Location	County / Parish	State	Start Coord.	Time (UTC)	Path length	Max width
EF1	Pebble City to NNE of Sale City	Mitchell	GA	31.2453°N 84.076°W	10:28–10:36	5.31 mi (8.55 km)	1,200 yd (1,100 m)
EF1	This tornado began south of SR 37, snapping trees and bending part of an irrigation system before moving into Pebble City, where it destroyed a volunteer fire department building and a community center. As it continued northeast, it snapped numerous trees and power poles, with more extensive tree damage noted along its path. The tornado continued northeast, where a double-wide manufactured home was shifted off its foundation, windows were blown out of two homes, and more trees were uprooted. The tornado dissipated shortly after uprooting another tree just west of the Mitchell-Colquitt county line.						
EF0	E of Girard (1st tornado)	Burke	GA	33.0272°N 81.6758°W	11:00–11:04	4.35 mi (7.00 km)	75 yd (69 m)
EF0	Several pine trees were snapped.						
EF0	E of Girard (2nd tornado)	Burke	GA	33.0289°N 81.6552°W	11:01–11:04	3.09 mi (4.97 km)	100 yd (91 m)
EF0	A home had its shingles damaged, and minor tree damage occurred.						
EF0	E of Snelling	Barnwell	SC	33.2373°N 81.4195°W	12:27–12:29	0.3 mi (0.48 km)	50 yd (46 m)
EF0	This weak tornado uprooted at least five pine trees and snapped several large branches.						
EF1	S of Chapin to W of Lake Murray of Richland	Lexington	SC	34.08°N 81.39°W	12:38–12:48	5.83 mi (9.38 km)	125 yd (114 m)
EF1	Weak tree damage occurred along the north side of Lake Murray.						
EF0	ENE of Racepond to SE of Hickox	Charlton, Brantley	GA	31.0328°N 82.043°W	14:52–15:01	6.79 mi (10.93 km)	10 yd (9.1 m)
EF0	A weak tornado snapped small trees and large branches as it moved east-northeast. The most significant damage occurred near the center of Winokur, where a shed was destroyed, shingles were blown off houses, and a large tree fell on power lines. The tornado continued into a forested area before dissipating.						
EF1	NW of Olustee	Columbia, Baker	FL	30.2663°N 82.4884°W	15:38–15:44	2.73 mi (4.39 km)	120 yd (110 m)
EF1	A tornado occurred in the Osceola National Forest, snapping or uprooting many trees.						
EF1	Northeastern St. Marys	Elk	PA	41.4934°N 78.4747°W	16:22–16:23	0.51 mi (0.82 km)	200 yd (180 m)
EF1	Hundreds of trees were downed, some of which were also uprooted. Utility poles were broken, a barn had its roof partially lifted, and a window on a house was also blown in.						
EF1	E of New Salem-Buffington	Fayette	PA	39.9087°N 79.7941°W	16:44–16:46	1.67 mi (2.69 km)	150 yd (140 m)
EF1	This tornado initially produced sporadic tree damage before intensifying, damaging homes, uprooting trees, and flattening a small shed. It continued northeast, tearing part of a roof off a house and lofting debris 500 ft (150 m) into a treeline. The tornado then weakened, causing minor damage before dissipating near US 40.						
EF1	E of Everson to N of Donegal	Fayette, Westmoreland	PA	40.084°N 79.4856°W	17:05–17:11	7.7 mi (12.4 km)	75 yd (69 m)
EF1	A tornado developed within a squall line, initially causing tree damage before intensifying and impacting several areas with snapped trees, tilted power poles, and structural damage, including a flipped RV trailer and a lost carport roof. The tornado weakened as it ascended a hillside near Donegal Lake and lifted.						
EF1	SW of Ligonier	Westmoreland	PA	40.2198°N 79.2946°W	17:19–17:20	1.21 mi (1.95 km)	50 yd (46 m)
EF1	A brief tornado primarily caused tree damage, snapping and uprooting numerous pines and maples.						
EF1	NNE of Ligonier to SSE of Bolivar	Westmoreland	PA	40.3002°N 79.1866°W	17:25–17:27	4.15 mi (6.68 km)	50 yd (46 m)
EF1	This short-lived tornado snapped hardwood trees and severely damaged a barn, stripping its roof and collapsing three walls. It weakened and dissipated after moving through a wooded area.						
EF1	N of Black Lick	Indiana	PA	40.4856°N 79.1785°W	17:30–17:31	1.21 mi (1.95 km)	50 yd (46 m)
EF1	A tornado touched down, partially collapsing a barn and damaging trees before intensifying along a ridge line. It snapped tree tops, destroyed a second barn, and lofted debris over 300 yd (270 m) before continuing into the woods, uprooting large hardwoods and snapping multiple trunks.						
EF1	WSW of Keating	Clinton	PA	41.2545°N 78.0534°W	18:48–18:49	0.66 mi (1.06 km)	500 yd (460 m)
EF1	Several hundred trees were uprooted or snapped.						
EF1	ENE of Currie to WSW of St. Helena	Pender	NC	34.4698°N 78.0314°W	23:25–23:28	3.14 mi (5.05 km)	200 yd (180 m)
EF1	Multiple dog kennels were damaged, homes had their roofs slightly damaged, and several trees were snapped.						

=== March 17 event ===
List of confirmed tornadoes – Monday, March 17, 2025
EF#	Location	County / Parish	State	Start Coord.	Time (UTC)	Path length	Max width
EF1	SE of Woodville to SW of Elizabeth City	Perquimans, Pasquotank	NC	36.22°N 76.319°W	07:02–07:06	3.38 mi (5.44 km)	100 yd (91 m)
EF1	This high-end EF1 tornado touched down southwest of the Longview Estates neighborhood where it rolled and destroyed three mobile homes, damaged several others, and caused eight injuries. It then moved northeast, downing numerous trees and damaging sheds before lifting a few minutes later.						

=== March 19 event ===
List of confirmed tornadoes – Wednesday, March 19, 2025
EF#	Location	County / Parish	State	Start Coord.	Time (UTC)	Path length	Max width
EFU	ESE of Banner	Tazewell	IL	40.5°N 89.85°W	19:49–19:50	0.67 mi (1.08 km)	30 yd (27 m)
EFU	A video of this brief tornado was recorded but no damage was found.						
EF1	N of Rardin	Coles	IL	39.608°N 88.11°W	21:52–21:54	0.72 mi (1.16 km)	50 yd (46 m)
EF1	A farm outbuilding was destroyed and siding was torn from a house.						
EF0	Southeastern Joliet	Will	IL	41.4895°N 88.0604°W	22:00–22:01	0.25 mi (0.40 km)	90 yd (82 m)
EF0	This brief tornado caused shingle damage to a home, uprooted trees, and tossed metal panels and parts of a carport over 200 yd (180 m). One vehicle was also blown over before the tornado dissipated.						
EF0	Eastern New Lenox	Will	IL	41.4984°N 87.9488°W	22:10–22:21	1.53 mi (2.46 km)	60 yd (55 m)
EF0	A weak tornado caused damage to shingles, trees, and fencing.						
EF0	Eastern Frankfort	Will	IL	41.487°N 87.7943°W	22:18–22:19	0.33 mi (0.53 km)	75 yd (69 m)
EF0	This brief tornado moved through a residential area near a forest preserve, breaking branches and uprooting a few small trees before dissipating.						
EF1	Steger	Will	IL	41.4624°N 87.6528°W	22:28–22:30	1.62 mi (2.61 km)	90 yd (82 m)
EF1	This tornado moved east-northeast through residential and commercial areas, causing shingle damage to multiple homes and removing part of a metal warehouse roof with debris scattered across nearby railroad tracks. Damage elsewhere included broken branches and minor tree damage before the tornado dissipated.						
EF0	Lynwood	Cook	IL	41.5167°N 87.5632°W	22:35–22:36	0.29 mi (0.47 km)	50 yd (46 m)
EF0	This brief tornado damaged the roofs of two industrial buildings and scattered debris across the area before lifting shortly after crossing a roadway.						
EF0	Highland	Lake	IN	41.539°N 87.473°W	22:43–22:45	1.85 mi (2.98 km)	50 yd (46 m)
EF0	This high-end EF0 tornado touched down near a commercial area, damaging a roof before moving through residential neighborhoods where it broke branches, damaged shingles, and uprooted a few trees. One large tree fell onto a home, causing roof damage, and fences were also affected. The tornado weakened as it continued northeast, with lighter tree damage before dissipating.						
EF0	Black Oak	Lake	IN	41.5654°N 87.4123°W	22:46–22:47	0.44 mi (0.71 km)	50 yd (46 m)
EF0	This tornado struck the Gary neighborhood of Black Oak. Two large trees were uprooted and the glass doors of a casino were blown out.						
EF1	Tolleston	Lake	IN	41.5775°N 87.3902°W	22:47–22:48	0.71 mi (1.14 km)	50 yd (46 m)
EF1	This high-end EF1 tornado occurred in the Gary neighborhood of Tolleston caused significant damage, ripping the roof off a school gymnasium, damaging several homes, and bending power poles and light fixtures. One person was injured when part of a roof collapsed.						
EF0	Downtown Gary	Lake	IN	41.5897°N 87.3515°W	22:50–22:52	1.83 mi (2.95 km)	50 yd (46 m)
EF0	This brief tornado moved through Downtown Gary, uprooting several small trees and scattering tree debris across roadways near Norton Park and east of the business district. It weakened and dissipated before reaching US 12.						
EF0	S of Logansport	Cass	IN	40.7213°N 86.3559°W	23:54–23:55	0.89 mi (1.43 km)	50 yd (46 m)
EF0	A weak tornado caused minor shingle and fence damage between two homes, bent a TV tower, and later uprooted or snapped about twenty shallow-rooted trees in a wooded area before lifting in an open field.						
EF0	NE of Macy to SSW of Akron	Miami, Fulton	IN	40.99°N 86.08°W	00:20–00:23	2.7 mi (4.3 km)	100 yd (91 m)
EF0	This high-end EF0 tornado touched down in a wooded area, flipping an outbuilding and scattering debris. It reached peak intensity near a barn that sustained extensive damage, with roofing and siding materials thrown across fields. The tornado continued northeast, flipping sections of an irrigation system and causing tree damage before dissipating.						
EF2	W of Rosstown to S of Newbern	Bartholomew	IN	39.1056°N 85.946°W	00:44–00:57	13.55 mi (21.81 km)	350 yd (320 m)
EF2	This low-end EF2 tornado began near I-65 and tracked northeast to near Hartsville, producing mostly weak damage. The tornado reached peak intensity upon collapsing metal farm buildings and lofting debris up to half a mile. Along its path, several utility poles were broken and small metal transmission towers were twisted before the tornado dissipated.						
EF1	Southern Hebron to WSW of Villa Hills	Boone	KY	39.0426°N 84.7044°W	02:54–02:56	3.15 mi (5.07 km)	90 yd (82 m)
EF1	This tornado touched down at an industrial site in the far southern part of Hebron, west of KY 237, partially removing a roof and uprooting trees. Moving east-northeastward, the tornado struck Cincinnati/Northern Kentucky International Airport where it caused extensive wall and roof damage to a building, shifted a Boeing 747 five feet, and damaged a dozen cars from flying debris. The tornado also damaged HVAC systems and more trees before lifting.						

=== March 23 event ===
List of confirmed tornadoes – Sunday, March 23, 2025
EF#	Location	County / Parish	State	Start Coord.	Time (UTC)	Path length	Max width
EF1	NW of Rolling Fork	Sharkey	MS	32.9194°N 90.9235°W	00:25–00:30	2.41 mi (3.88 km)	50 yd (46 m)
EF1	This tornado touched down near Rolling Fork, causing some minor tree damage along the Indian Bayou. It then moved northeastward into the farmlands between the Indian Bayou and MS 16. The tornado struck a home along MS 16, causing some roof damage and damage to a small storage building before lifting.						
EF0	E of Hatley	Monroe	MS	33.9784°N 88.3912°W	02:09–02:11	1.88 mi (3.03 km)	50 yd (46 m)
EF0	This tornado briefly touched down east of Hatley, producing minor tree damage.						

=== March 27 event ===
List of confirmed tornadoes – Thursday, March 27, 2025
EF#	Location	County / Parish	State	Start Coord.	Time (UTC)	Path length	Max width
EF0	Eastern Edcouch	Hidalgo	TX	26.2927°N 97.9507°W	20:50–20:51	0.25 mi (0.40 km)	75 yd (69 m)
EF0	A weak tornado touched down in eastern Edcouch, severely damaging an old warehouse and hangar belonging to a crop dusting company, with debris scattered across nearby fields and significant damage to an aircraft inside. Additional impacts included a downed fence, snapped tree limbs, and damaged utility poles along the short path.						

=== March 28 event ===
List of confirmed tornadoes – Friday, March 28, 2025
EF#	Location	County / Parish	State	Start Coord.	Time (UTC)	Path length	Max width
EF0	Port Isabel	Cameron	TX	26.0714°N 97.2021°W	07:10–07:12	0.14 mi (0.23 km)	75 yd (69 m)
EF0	A bridge had minor damage inflicted to it.						
EF1	SE of Shelbyville	Shelby	TX	31.7024°N 94.0336°W	18:48–19:03	5.64 mi (9.08 km)	472 yd (432 m)
EF1	The roofs of chicken houses were damaged and numerous trees were uprooted or snapped.						
EF0	ESE of Vivian to WSW of Ida	Caddo	LA	32.8615°N 93.9394°W	20:33–20:53	8.85 mi (14.24 km)	450 yd (410 m)
EF0	A high-end EF0 tornado caused scattered tree damage around Black Bayou Lake and damaged the roof of a shed.						

=== March 30 event ===
List of confirmed tornadoes – Sunday, March 30, 2025
EF#	Location	County / Parish	State	Start Coord.	Time (UTC)	Path length	Max width
EF0	S of Bald Hill	Okmulgee	OK	35.681°N 95.844°W	05:33–05:36	2.3 mi (3.7 km)	300 yd (270 m)
EF0	Multiple outbuildings and trees were damaged. Large tree limbs were also snapped.						
EF0	E of Wade to NW of Hurley	Jackson	MS	30.64°N 88.53°W	16:46–16:56	2.84 mi (4.57 km)	25 yd (23 m)
EF0	Scattered tree damage occurred.						
EF1	SE of Ivesdale to Northern Tolono	Champaign	IL	39.8918°N 88.4244°W	18:22–18:34	12.16 mi (19.57 km)	200 yd (180 m)
EF1	This tornado damaged mainly outbuildings and trees with a few of the trees uprooted. The most significant damage was to an outbuilding where all four walls collapsed and the roof fell into the contents of the building, starting a fire on a gas tank outside the building.						
EF0	W of Vancleave	Jackson	MS	30.54°N 88.79°W	18:37–18:39	0.58 mi (0.93 km)	75 yd (69 m)
EF0	Minor damage occurred to mobile homes, trees were uprooted and large tree branches were downed.						
EF0	SW of Conrad to SE of Sumava Resorts	Newton	IN	41.0825°N 87.485°W	19:28–19:33	6.09 mi (9.80 km)	200 yd (180 m)
EF0	The tornado began by uprooting trees near a barn, then tracked northeast and snapped additional trees and caused sporadic limb damage along its path. It continued to produce scattered tree damage before lifting.						
EF1	N of Oak Grove to SE of Donaldson	Starke, Marshall	IN	41.321°N 86.477°W	20:22–20:28	3.2 mi (5.1 km)	750 yd (690 m)
EF1	This tornado developed quickly southwest of Ancilla College, causing extensive tree damage and minor structural damage across the campus and nearby lake area. The tornado then overturned a mobile home, injuring an occupant, and then proceeded to damage several homes and destroy multiple barns before lifting.						
EF1	Edwardsburg	Cass	MI	41.79°N 86.1°W	20:52–20:55	2.59 mi (4.17 km)	100 yd (91 m)
EF1	This tornado touched down in Edwardsburg, snapping and uprooting trees as it moved northeast. It caused minor damage near a primary school before intensifying near Pleasant Lake. Several homes and businesses were damaged, including roof damage at a marina, overturned boats, and docks lifted from the lake. The strongest damage occurred northeast of the lake, where numerous large trees were snapped or uprooted. The tornado then dissipated shortly after.						
EF1	NE of Edwardsburg to S of Cassopolis	Cass	MI	41.84°N 86.05°W	20:56–20:58	2.01 mi (3.23 km)	200 yd (180 m)
EF1	The tornado touched down in a field west of M-62, damaging several outbuildings, including one that lost most of its metal roof, with debris scattered across the street. It then intensified, snapping and uprooting several groves of trees . The tornado continued to snap trees and flip center pivots before lifting.						
EF1	NW of Ege	Noble	IN	41.29°N 85.31°W	21:16–21:18	1.41 mi (2.27 km)	200 yd (180 m)
EF1	Several large trees were snapped and multiple barns were damaged, including one that partially collapsed with its debris scattered a quarter mile away. The tornado also destroyed part of a pole barn and damaged vehicles before continuing through open fields and causing more tree damage before dissipating.						
EF0	SE of Klingers to W of Sturgis	St. Joseph	MI	41.766°N 85.509°W	21:17–21:20	3.57 mi (5.75 km)	300 yd (270 m)
EF0	A weak tornado touched down, snapping over a dozen pine trees and uprooting several others. It moved northeast, damaging an empty grain bin and a portion of a pole barn roof, with the grain bin thrown into power lines, causing several power poles to snap. A center pivot was rolled once, and more trees were blown down onto power lines. The tornado continued across open fields near US 12, with a piece of metal from the barn roof wrapped around a pole several feet off the ground. Another center pivot was damaged before the tornado dissipated shortly thereafter.						
EF1	W of Hudson to NNW of Pleasant Lake	Steuben	IN	41.54°N 85.11°W	21:28–21:35	5.72 mi (9.21 km)	100 yd (91 m)
EF1	The tornado began near Little Turkey Lake, damaging several trees and a collapsing a metal barn. It continued northeast, snapping and uprooting trees on the southwest side of Long Lake before crossing the lake and damaging homes along a nearby road. Notable tree damage was also observed at a boy scout camp before the tornado ended.						
EF0	S of Cutlerville to SSE of Dutton	Kent	MI	42.78°N 85.65°W	21:42–21:47	4.2 mi (6.8 km)	150 yd (140 m)
EF0	This tornado began with snapped and uprooted trees, then continued northeast, destroying a barn and scattering debris across a field. It caused additional damage to outbuildings and trees as it passed through a farm and ended near a row of trees.						
EF1	N of Kent City	Kent	MI	43.247°N 85.747°W	21:58–22:00	1.66 mi (2.67 km)	250 yd (230 m)
EF1	Two homes had minor damage to their roofs and scattered tree damage occurred.						
EF0	NE of Forest Hills	Kent	MI	43.027°N 85.368°W	22:00–22:03	2.43 mi (3.91 km)	300 yd (270 m)
EF0	A tornado touched down southeast of Murray Lake, causing significant damage to farm buildings, including the collapse of an outbuilding and the loss of roofing materials, with sheet metal carried about 0.4 mi (0.64 km). The tornado downed approximately twenty five trees in one area, and several more trees were uprooted on the east side of a road, dissipating shortly after.						
EF0	E of Rockford	Kent	MI	43.128°N 85.496°W	22:00–22:10	5 mi (8.0 km)	150 yd (140 m)
EF0	Dozens of trees were snapped or uprooted, and a center pivot irrigator was tipped over.						
EF1	NE of Oxly to SSW of Harviell	Ripley, Butler	MO	36.61°N 90.6492°W	22:02–22:11	8.59 mi (13.82 km)	50 yd (46 m)
EF1	This tornado caused mostly tree damage and ripped the roof off an outbuilding. As it moved east into Butler county, it damaged a mobile home roof, caused shingle damage to another house, and uprooted or snapped several trees before dissipating.						
EF0	E of Grant	Newaygo	MI	43.34°N 85.731°W	22:05–22:09	2.8 mi (4.5 km)	50 yd (46 m)
EF0	A brief tornado damaged trees and impacted two utility transmission towers.						
EF0	W of Belding	Ionia, Montcalm	MI	43.098°N 85.312°W	22:07–22:10	2.1 mi (3.4 km)	150 yd (140 m)
EF0	Several farm or outbuildings sustained damage and a couple of homes saw damage to their siding and roofs. A large number of trees were also downed throughout the tornado's path.						
EF0	Leslie	Ingham	MI	42.44°N 84.44°W	22:20–22:23	2.7 mi (4.3 km)	50 yd (46 m)
EF0	This tornado began with snapped and uprooted trees, then moved northeast causing additional tree damage, minor home damage, and the loss of several outbuildings.						
EF0	NNW of Muir	Ionia	MI	43.031°N 84.957°W	22:21–22:22	0.5 mi (0.80 km)	25 yd (23 m)
EF0	Minor damage to trees and properties occurred.						
EF1	NE of Williamston	Ingham	MI	42.71°N 84.27°W	22:40–22:45	5.3 mi (8.5 km)	150 yd (140 m)
EF1	A tornado touched down causing damage to multiple homes, including a two-story house that lost its roof and several others with roof and siding damage. The tornado also destroyed barns, outbuildings, and a carport while uprooting several trees along its path.						
EF0	S of Clear Creek	Monroe	IN	39.0843°N 86.5392°W	22:45–22:46	0.11 mi (0.18 km)	30 yd (27 m)
EF0	A church had its roof damaged and playground equipment was tossed around.						
EF0	Southern Milan	Monroe	MI	42.068°N 83.69°W	22:51–22:53	0.38 mi (0.61 km)	100 yd (91 m)
EF0	A brief tornado damaged a few homes.						
EF1	Five Points North	Shiawassee	MI	43.07°N 84.17°W	23:00–23:02	0.86 mi (1.38 km)	100 yd (91 m)
EF1	Numerous homes were damaged.						
EF1	NE of Zewapeta, MO to SE of Ullin	Alexander, Pulaski	IL	37.1818°N 89.4448°W	23:05–23:24	23.87 mi (38.42 km)	150 yd (140 m)
EF1	This tornado began near the Mississippi River, uprooting or snapping numerous trees and causing some roof damage to buildings.						
EF0	WSW of Napoleon	Ripley	IN	39.19°N 85.37°W	23:54–23:56	2.2 mi (3.5 km)	100 yd (91 m)
EF0	A few trees were downed and a home suffered minor damage.						
EF1	W of Lookout to Behlmer Corner to NW of Clinton	Ripley	IN	39.1936°N 85.2296°W	00:02–00:08	4.78 mi (7.69 km)	200 yd (180 m)
EF1	A tornado began with concentrated damage along a road, where several trees and outbuildings were damaged. It then crossed SR 48, destroying an outbuilding, before continuing eastward. As it moved, it uprooted trees and caused minor damage to homes. The tornado intensified, damaging a barn and snapping multiple trees. The tornado continued eastward, causing more tree damage and further destruction to outbuildings before dissipating.						
EF0	E of Fisher to SW of Harrisburg	Poinsett	AR	35.48°N 90.9°W	00:39–00:45	4.78 mi (7.69 km)	150 yd (140 m)
EF0	A tornado touched down, snapping rotted trees, breaking large tree limbs, and damaging a power line before moving through open fields and lifting near the L'Anguille River. Further track adjustments may be made with additional evaluation.						
EF0	Williamsdale to Western Monroe	Butler	OH	39.4441°N 84.5308°W	00:40–00:50	6.89 mi (11.09 km)	150 yd (140 m)
EF0	This tornado initially damaged several mobile homes and snapped or uprooted numerous trees. It continued east-northeast, causing additional tree and power pole damage and damaging outbuildings and homes near a subdivision east of the Great Miami River. Roof sections were removed from some homes and many others experienced shingle and flashing damage before the tornado weakened and transitioned into straight-line winds in western Monroe.						
EF0	Southern Wetherington to Mason to W of Morrow	Butler, Warren	OH	39.3559°N 84.3829°W	00:52–01:06	11.71 mi (18.85 km)	200 yd (180 m)
EF0	This tornado caused minor house and tree damage before crossing into Warren county where it affected multiple subdivisions in Mason with uprooted trees and light structural damage. It overturned trailers at an RV resort and caused additional damage through Kings Mills, including a partial garage wall collapse at one home. The tornado continued eastward causing scattered tree and home damage before dissipating near Little Miami High School.						
EF0	ESE of Dodds to W of Wellman	Warren	OH	39.48°N 84.11°W	01:07–01:11	3.05 mi (4.91 km)	150 yd (140 m)
EF0	A high-end EF0 tornado touched down near the Little Miami River, snapping hardwood trees and breaking large limbs as it tracked east-northeast. It destroyed a barn, caused significant roof and wall damage, and uprooted several more trees before ending near a visitor center in Caesar Creek State Park where additional tree damage occurred but no structural impacts were reported.						
EF1	NW of Harned to SW of Garfield	Breckinridge	KY	37.7645°N 86.425°W	01:20–01:23	2.55 mi (4.10 km)	30 yd (27 m)
EF1	This tornado caused roof damage to a barn and downed several trees as it moved northeast. The most significant damage occurred near US 60, where multiple barns sustained roof damage, and a barn and garage were completely destroyed. A nearby residence also had some damage. The tornado weakened as it moved further east before ultimately lifting.						
EF1	WNW of Midway to SSE of Bardstown Junction	Meade, Hardin, Bullitt	KY	37.9605°N 86.2594°W	01:23–01:55	30.28 mi (48.73 km)	500 yd (460 m)
EF1	This long-tracked tornado tracked through northern Fort Knox, downing or snapping numerous trees along its path. Notable damage included affected properties, a destroyed barn, and significant tree loss in parks and near Fort Knox facilities.						
EF1	ESE of Pleasant View to Jeffersonville	Fayette	OH	39.65°N 83.6°W	01:35–01:39	3.91 mi (6.29 km)	250 yd (230 m)
EF1	This tornado caused minor tree damage at its starting point and then intensified as it destroyed an outbuilding, removed roofing from two structures, and snapped hardwood trees. As it continued, it damaged power poles, tore metal roof panels from a service station, and flipped multiple RVs at a dealership before dissipating.						
EF1	NW of Flaherty to Northern Radcliff	Meade, Hardin	KY	37.8445°N 86.0762°W	01:35–01:44	7.18 mi (11.56 km)	50 yd (46 m)
EF1	A tornado began south of Flaherty Elementary School, causing major roof loss to a farm outbuilding and roof damage to a nearby residence. It continued along its path, causing tree damage and impacting a residence where the roof was lifted and blown 100 yd (91 m) away. The tornado then moved into rural areas of Meade County, causing additional roof and siding damage, followed by more tree damage that indicated rotation. As it continued, it struck neighborhoods in western Radcliff, causing isolated tree damage, and finally ended near US 31W where more tree damage was observed.						
EF1	Southern Louisville	Jefferson	KY	38.0983°N 85.7683°W	01:48–01:54	5.43 mi (8.74 km)	30 yd (27 m)
EF1	This tornado began near an elementary school where large branches were snapped and a shed was rolled. It then intensified near several homes and twisted and uprooted trees, causing one injury. It moved through neighborhoods, shifting a garage off its foundation and lofting roofing materials into trees. Further along, it caused major damage to a barn, impaled wooden planks into a home, and struck a brick house with enough force to break windows and tear off the roof. The tornado continued through multiple residential and industrial areas, snapping trees, damaging structures, and leaving visible ground scarring from debris before weakening and dissipating.						
EF0	Obetz	Franklin	OH	39.87°N 82.98°W	02:10–02:13	2.58 mi (4.15 km)	250 yd (230 m)
EF0	The tornado started south of I-270, where it caused minor damage to carports and homes in a mobile home park. It then continued east, causing additional minor damage to homes and lawn furniture. After crossing I-270, the tornado intensified slightly, causing roof and siding damage, along with uprooted trees. The tornado continued northeast, causing minor damage to homes and trees along several streets, before dissipating.						
EF1	W of Mount Eden	Spencer	KY	38.0423°N 85.2148°W	02:23–02:27	2.5 mi (4.0 km)	80 yd (73 m)
EF1	This tornado began with sporadic tree damage, then intensified as it struck a property where two barns were destroyed and debris was thrown hundreds of yards, including into a utility pole. Wind speeds peaked at 90 mph (140 km/h) with boards impaled in the ground and extensive damage noted. The tornado continued causing tree damage along a creek before dissipating near a rural intersection.						
EF1	NE of Waverly to NW of McEwen	Humphreys	TN	36.144°N 87.7188°W	03:07–03:10	2.04 mi (3.28 km)	150 yd (140 m)
EF1	A home had its roof damaged and multiple trees were snapped or uprooted.						
EF0	NE of Buffalo	Humphreys	TN	35.9312°N 87.7743°W	03:25–03:28	2.52 mi (4.06 km)	300 yd (270 m)
EF0	Trees, powerlines and a few structures were damaged.						
EF0	SW of Fairview	Hickman, Williamson	TN	35.9356°N 87.2085°W	04:07–04:11	2.17 mi (3.49 km)	150 yd (140 m)
EF0	Several trees were snapped and uprooted around I-840.						
EF0	WSW of Linden	Perry	TN	35.585°N 87.9291°W	04:12–04:13	0.3 mi (0.48 km)	50 yd (46 m)
EF0	Several trees were snapped and uprooted, and two structures were damaged.						

=== March 31 event ===
List of confirmed tornadoes – Monday, March 31, 2025
EF#	Location	County / Parish	State	Start Coord.	Time (UTC)	Path length	Max width
EF2	NE of Hampshire to N of Mount Pleasant	Maury	TN	35.6018°N 87.2808°W	05:00–05:07	5.61 mi (9.03 km)	350 yd (320 m)
EF2	This strong tornado caused timber damage and damaged a barn before moving through a wooded area. It intensified and caused significant structural damage to a home, removing its roof and collapsing most walls. The tornado then weakened, causing more tree damage before dissipating.						
EF1	Southern Columbia	Maury	TN	35.5867°N 87.1026°W	05:14–05:21	4.06 mi (6.53 km)	300 yd (270 m)
EF1	This tornado touched down and uprooted trees as it continued southeast across a residential area. Minor timber damage was observed before the tornado dissipated after crossing US 31.						
EF2	SE of Grand Prairie	St. Landry	LA	30.6761°N 92.1476°W	09:22–09:26	1.82 mi (2.93 km)	250 yd (230 m)
EF2	This tornado began near a church where it caused roof damage, damaged covered walkways, and downed trees. As it continued, an RV was flipped and one home experienced total roof loss before the tornado weakened and lifted, leaving behind minor tree damage.						
EF1	ENE of Georgetown	Simpson	MS	31.8782°N 90.1212°W	10:37–10:41	3.3 mi (5.3 km)	340 yd (310 m)
EF1	A brief tornado touched down along MS 28, causing minor tree damage before overturning part of an irrigation pivot. It then intensified as it crossed into a more focused area of snapped and uprooted trees, damaging a shed and downing power lines, before dissipating near MS 469.						
EF0	NW of Columbus	Lowndes	MS	33.5898°N 88.4578°W	11:01–11:02	0.69 mi (1.11 km)	60 yd (55 m)
EF0	A brief and weak tornado caused minor tree damage as it crossed through the area, uprooting a few trees and breaking large limbs, one of which landed on a home.						
EF1	NE of Columbus, MS to NE of Steens, MS	Lowndes (MS), Lamar (AL)	MS, AL	33.5868°N 88.3745°W	11:07–11:15	8.1 mi (13.0 km)	300 yd (270 m)
EF1	This weak tornado caused scattered tree limb damage and uprooted trees along its path with the most significant impacts occurring early on where a tree fell on a home. Five homes had minor roof damage, a shed was destroyed, and a fence was blown down.						
EF2	SE of Hub to NNW of Baxterville	Marion, Lamar	MS	31.1332°N 89.7389°W	11:30–11:47	7.4 mi (11.9 km)	300 yd (270 m)
EF2	This high-end EF2 tornado began with minor tree damage but quickly intensified as it moved northeast through forested areas, snapping softwood trunks and causing damage to homes near the county line. It reached peak intensity just across the Lamar county line, where hundreds of trees were snapped or uprooted, a well-built home lost its entire roof, and multiple other homes—including a mobile home—were pushed off their foundations. The tornado gradually weakened as it continued, causing more tree damage and one final home impact before dissipating.						
EF0	Southwestern Holden	Livingston	LA	30.50°N 90.68°W	11:54–12:01	3.56 mi (5.73 km)	25 yd (23 m)
EF0	A tornado touched down in Holden, breaking branches along its southeast path and causing light damage to manufactured homes before dissipating in an inaccessible area.						
EF0	S of Carrollton	Carroll	GA	33.5159°N 85.0846°W	16:10–16:16	5.31 mi (8.55 km)	300 yd (270 m)
EF0	Tree damage occurred, a few of which fell on homes.						
EF0	Eastern Newnan	Coweta	GA	33.3746°N 84.757°W	16:32–16:39	4.97 mi (8.00 km)	250 yd (230 m)
EF0	The tornado began just east of I-85 in Newnan and tracked northeast, snapping large branches and trees along a narrow path. It reached peak strength in a residential subdivision where multiple trees were snapped, then weakened before lifting near another neighborhood.						
EF0	Fayetteville	Fayette	GA	33.4402°N 84.4544°W	16:54–16:55	0.24 mi (0.39 km)	50 yd (46 m)
EF0	A few tree limbs were downed.						
EF1	N of McDonough	Henry	GA	33.4775°N 84.2293°W	17:08–17:16	6.55 mi (10.54 km)	100 yd (91 m)
EF1	This low-end EF1 tornado initially downed several large trees and damaged a home. It intensified as it moved through a residential neighborhood, toppling around 40 trees at its peak before weakening and eventually lifting near a cemetery. Damage was consistent with intermittent circulation along most of its path.						
EF0	NNW of Midland City	Dale	AL	31.34°N 85.51°W	17:22–17:24	0.71 mi (1.14 km)	50 yd (46 m)
EF0	A brief tornado caused numerous large tree limbs and tops to break, flipped a shed, and blew over a fence.						
EF1	Dothan	Houston	AL	31.2068°N 85.4184°W	17:31–17:35	3.09 mi (4.97 km)	200 yd (180 m)
EF1	A tornado touched down in Dothan, traveling east-northeast, where it caused scattered tree damage, some of which fell on homes. The tornado caused substantial damage to the Dothan Preparatory Academy, including roof removal and broken windows, resulting in minor injuries to five students. It continued across US 231, damaging several businesses, snapping power poles, and uprooting trees, some of which fell on houses and vehicles. The tornado ended near a hospital after damaging a doctor’s office and uprooting a few more trees.						
EF0	NNE of Byron to N of Warner Robins	Peach, Houston, Bibb	GA	32.6691°N 83.7392°W	18:11–18:20	6.89 mi (11.09 km)	100 yd (91 m)
EF0	A tornado developed in northern Peach county, uprooting a few pecan trees before traveling east-northeast and downing more trees as it crossed into northwestern Houston county. It continued into swampy, forested areas along the Echeconnee River, eventually lifting in extreme southeast Bibb county where a few trees were downed, blocking a road for a few hours.						
EF0	Centerville to Northern Warner Robins	Houston	GA	32.6184°N 83.6937°W	18:13–18:19	3.59 mi (5.78 km)	150 yd (140 m)
EF0	This tornado touched down in Centerville, quickly moving northeast and into northern Warner Robins, where it downed hundreds of trees. Many of the trees fell on approximately 100 homes and several vehicles, causing some entrapments.						
EF0	ESE of Tallahassee	Leon	FL	30.3698°N 84.1849°W	19:46–19:49	1.9 mi (3.1 km)	100 yd (91 m)
EF0	Several pine trees were snapped.						

== See also ==
- Tornadoes of 2025
- List of United States tornadoes from November to December 2024
- List of United States tornadoes in April 2025
