= Rombauer =

Rombauer may refer to:

- Rombauer (horse), a Thoroughbred racehorse that won the 2021 Preakness Stakes
- Rombauer, Missouri, an unincorporated community in the United States
- Irma S. Rombauer (1877–1962), an American cookbook author who wrote The Joy of Cooking
- Johann Rombauer (1782–1849), a Hungarian portrait painter
