= Loam, Kentucky =

Unincorporated community in Kentucky, United States

- Ghost town
- Location within Kentucky Location within the United States
- Country: United States
- State: Kentucky
- County: Jackson
- GNIS feature ID

Loam is a ghost town located in southwestern Jackson County, Kentucky, United States. The town was located along Horse Lick Creek. It is located southwest of McKee by seven miles (11 km), and 2.7 miles (4.3 km) northwest of another ghost town, Dango. The town is located on Bethel Church Road according to the KYTC's State Primary Road System map for Jackson County. Heavy settlement and farming occurred in the area around Horse Lick Creek until the early 1900s. The area where Loam was is currently occupied by the Daniel Boone National Forest, in the Horse Lick Creek Biopreserve, with the majority of ownership being private.

The town had a post office.
