= Wellman, Ohio =

Unincorporated community in Ohio, U.S.

Coordinates: 39°28′57″N 84°01′57″W

Wellman is an unincorporated community in Massie Township, Warren County, in the U.S. state of Ohio.

== History ==
Variant names were "Henpeck", "Hen Peck", and "Wells". A post office called Henpeck was established in 1890, the name was changed to Wellman in 1894, and the post office closed in 1901.
