= Bald Hill, Oklahoma =

Village in Oklahoma, US

Coordinates: 35°44′25″N 95°50′14″W

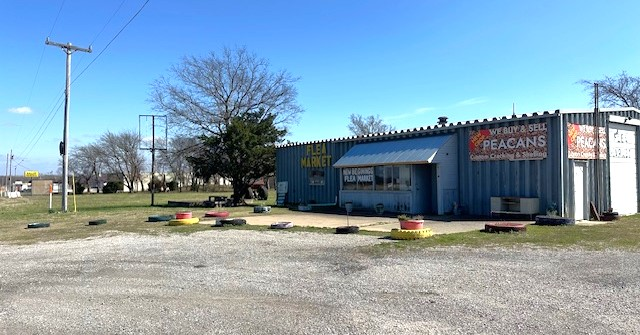
Stores on the site of Bald Hill, 3-2026

Bald Hill, or Baldhill (Creek: 'Kvn-Polokuce), is a community in Okmulgee County, Oklahoma. It is located about 15 miles northeast of the City of Okmulgee, the county seat, off of Oklahoma State Highway 16. A post office was established here in 1896, but was closed in 1908. Nevertheless, the town was fueled by oil money, and had a population of 150 in 1923.

Bald Hill was the location of a mansion on a high hill belonging to Enos Wilson. Wilson was recognized in 1935 by the Superintendent of the Five Civilized Tribes as then being the “world’s richest Indian.” A paper referred to the mansion as “his famous peak castle.”

Bald Hill is now considered a ghost town.
