= Roxana, Georgia =

- Unincorporated community
- Roxana location in Georgia (U.S. State)
- Coordinates: 33°59′57″N 84°45′46″W
- Country: United States
- State: Georgia
- County: Paulding
- Elevation: 958 ft (292 m)
- Time zone: UTC−5 (EST)
  - Summer (DST): UTC−4 (EDT)
- GNIS feature ID: 1730674

Roxana is an unincorporated community in Paulding County, Georgia, United States. It is located on Dallas Acworth Highway near Gracepointe Church and Somerset Drive, and extending to the Seven Hills Community in Dallas, Georgia past Seven Hills Blvd. and Harmony Grove Road.

The Crossroads Community begins where Dallas Acworth Highway and Cedarcrest Road intersect and includes the northeastern part of Dallas, Georgia and parts of Acworth, Georgia. This area includes zip codes 30132 and 30101.

The Crossroads Library is located at 909 Harmony Grove Church Road, Acworth, Georgia, 30101, part of Paulding County.
