= Nuckles, Arkansas =

Unincorporated community in Arkansas, US

Coordinates: 35°34′04″N 91°21′26″W

Nuckles is an unincorporated community in Jackson County, Arkansas, United States.
