= Turners Mill, Missouri =

Extinct town in the American state of Missouri

Coordinates: 36°45′59″N 91°15′59″W

Turners Mill is an extinct town in eastern Oregon County, in the U.S. state of Missouri. The GNIS classifies it as a populated place. The mill was adjacent to Turners Spring on the north bank of the Eleven Point River.

The community has the name of Jesse L. Clay Turner, the proprietor of a local mill. A variant name was "Surprise". A post office called Surprise was established in 1895, and remained in operation until 1925.
