= Dango, Kentucky =

Unincorporated community in Kentucky, United States

- Ghost town
- Crossing at Horse Lick Creek at Dango, KY

- Location within Kentucky Location within the United States
- Coordinates: 37°22′10″N 84°06′53″W
- Country: United States
- State: Kentucky
- County: Jackson
- Elevation: 932 ft (284 m)
- Time zone: UTC-5 (Eastern (EST))
  - Summer (DST): UTC-4 (EST)
- GNIS feature ID

Dango is a ghost town located in southwestern Jackson County, Kentucky, United States. The town was located at the confluence of Racoon Creek and Horse Lick Creek, which flows into the Rockcastle River. It is located southwest of McKee by 8 miles, and 2.7 miles southeast of another ghost town, Loam. Near the confluence of the two creeks is the historical Carpenter School, which may be named after Carpenter Ridge, of which it is two miles south of. Heavy settlement and farming occurred in the area around Horse Lick Creek, where Dango was, until the early 1900s. The area where Dango was is currently occupied by the Daniel Boone National Forest, known as the Horse Lick Creek Biopreserve, with the majority of ownership being private.

Confluence of Horse Lick and Racoon Creeks, the site of Dango's post office according to coordinates

The town had a post office which opened up in 1907 and closed in 1926 or 1927.
