= Rombauer, Missouri =

- Unincorporated community
- Location within Missouri Location within the United States
- Coordinates: 36°50′35″N 90°16′48″W
- Country: United States
- State: Missouri
- County: Butler
- Elevation: 335 ft (102 m)
- Time zone: UTC-6 (Central (CST))
  - Summer (DST): UTC-5 (CDT)
- Area code: 573
- GNIS feature ID: 751957

Rombauer is an unincorporated community in eastern Butler County, Missouri, United States. It is located approximately seven miles northeast of Poplar Bluff on the edge of the Mark Twain National Forest at an elevation of 335 feet (102 m).

== History ==
A post office called Rombauer has been in operation since 1902. The community was named after Roderick E. Rombauer, a judge in St. Louis, Missouri.

=== Climate ===
The climate in this area is characterized by hot, humid summers and generally mild to cool winters. According to the Köppen Climate Classification system, Rombauer has a humid subtropical climate, abbreviated "Cfa" on climate maps.
