= National Register of Historic Places listings in Pickens County, Alabama =

Location of Pickens County in Alabama

This is a list of the National Register of Historic Places listings in Pickens County, Alabama.

This is intended to be a complete list of the properties and districts on the National Register of Historic Places in Pickens County, Alabama, United States. Latitude and longitude coordinates are provided for many National Register properties and districts; these locations may be seen together in a Google map.

There are seven properties and districts listed on the National Register in the county.

This National Park Service list is complete through NPS recent listings posted January 16, 2026.

	Name on the Register	Image	Date listed	Location	City or town	Description
1	Aliceville Elementary and High School		May 9, 1980 (#80000734)	420 3rd Ave., NE. 33°07′44″N 88°08′49″W	Aliceville	
2	Parks E. Ball House	Parks E. Ball House	January 18, 1982 (#82002069)	Northwest of Aliceville; 33°09′22″N 88°11′42″W	Aliceville vicinity	
3	Hugh Wilson Hill House	Hugh Wilson Hill House	April 13, 1989 (#89000292)	201 Phoenix; 33°15′46″N 88°05′45″W	Carrollton	
4	MONTGOMERY (snagboat)	MONTGOMERY (snagboat)	November 28, 1983 (#83003521)	Tom Bevill Visitor Center; 33°12′44″N 88°17′10″W	Pickensville	
5	Old Jail	Old Jail	December 17, 1974 (#74000434)	Northeastern corner of the junction of Church St. and 1st Ave. 33°19′14″N 87°54′14″W	Gordo	
6	Pickens County Courthouse	Pickens County Courthouse	May 19, 1994 (#94000441)	Junction of State Route 17, Phoenix St. (County Road 35) and Tuscaloosa St. (State Route 86); 33°15′43″N 88°05′42″W	Carrollton	
7	Stewart-Blanton House		May 23, 1985 (#85001130)	State Route 86; 33°15′24″N 88°09′28″W	Carrollton vicinity	Building no more existing.

== See also ==
- List of National Historic Landmarks in Alabama
- National Register of Historic Places listings in Alabama
