= National Register of Historic Places listings in Randolph County, Alabama =

Location of Randolph County in Alabama

This is a list of the National Register of Historic Places listings in Randolph County, Alabama.

This is intended to be a complete list of the properties and districts on the National Register of Historic Places in Randolph County, Alabama, United States. Latitude and longitude coordinates are provided for many National Register properties and districts; these locations may be seen together in a Google map.

There are three properties and districts listed on the National Register in the county.

This National Park Service list is complete through NPS recent listings posted January 30, 2026.

	Name on the Register	Image	Date listed	Location	City or town	Description
1	McCosh Grist Mill	McCosh Grist Mill	November 21, 1976 (#76000353)	Southeast of Rock Mills on McCosh Mill Rd. 33°06′29″N 85°14′06″W	Rock Mills	
2	Roanoke Downtown Historic District	Roanoke Downtown Historic District	February 3, 1993 (#85003683)	Roughly bounded by White, Main, W. Point, La Monte, Chestnut, and Louina Sts. 33°09′08″N 85°22′31″W	Roanoke	
3	Wadley Railroad Depot	Wadley Railroad Depot	July 14, 2011 (#11000428)	Broad St. at NE. corner of Tallapoosa St. 33°07′18″N 85°33′46″W	Wadley	

== See also ==
- List of National Historic Landmarks in Alabama
- National Register of Historic Places listings in Alabama
