= National Register of Historic Places listings in Covington County, Alabama =

Location of Covington County in Alabama

This is a list of the National Register of Historic Places listings in Covington County, Alabama.

This is intended to be a complete list of the properties and districts on the National Register of Historic Places in Covington County, Alabama, United States. Latitude and longitude coordinates are provided for many National Register properties and districts; these locations may be seen together in an online map.

There are 10 properties and districts listed on the National Register in the county.

This National Park Service list is complete through NPS recent listings posted January 2, 2026.

	Name on the Register	Image	Date listed	Location	City or town	Description
1	Andalusia Commercial Historic District	Andalusia Commercial Historic District	January 26, 1989 (#88003238)	Roughly bounded by Coffee St., the former Seaboard Coast Line railroad tracks, and S. Three Notch St.; also Court Sq., O'Neal Ct., Central, Church, Coffee, North Cotton, South Cotton, Crescent, Dunson, Historic Central, Pear, East Three Notch, and South Three Notch Sts. 31°18′23″N 86°28′51″W	Andalusia	Second set of addresses represent boundary alterations approved November 17, 2022.
2	Avant House	Avant House	February 16, 1996 (#96000046)	909 Sanford Rd. 31°19′05″N 86°26′45″W	Andalusia	
3	Bank of Andalusia	Bank of Andalusia	January 28, 1989 (#88003239)	28 S. Court Sq. 31°18′27″N 86°28′56″W	Andalusia	
4	Central of Georgia Depot	Central of Georgia Depot	August 30, 1984 (#84000606)	125 Central St. 31°18′24″N 86°28′50″W	Andalusia	
5	Covington County Courthouse and Jail	Covington County Courthouse and Jail	January 28, 1989 (#88003240)	101 N. Court Sq. 31°18′31″N 86°28′56″W	Andalusia	
6	First National Bank Building	First National Bank Building	August 26, 1982 (#82002006)	101 S. Cotton St. 31°18′27″N 86°28′55″W	Andalusia	
7	Florala Historic District		December 21, 2010 (#10001050)	23216-24310 Fifth Ave., N. Fifth St., 519-1189 S. Fifth St., 1113-1115 Fourth St., 22510-22664 Wall St. 31°00′21″N 86°19′42″W	Florala	
8	J.W. Shreve Addition Historic District	J.W. Shreve Addition Historic District	September 9, 2009 (#09000692)	115-300 6th Ave., 302-425 College St., and 403-505 E. Three Notch St. 31°18′38″N 86°28′38″W	Andalusia	
9	Opp Commercial Historic District		October 29, 2001 (#01001164)	Roughly bounded by Covington Ave. and Hart, Main, Whaley, and College Sts. 31°16′55″N 86°15′14″W	Opp	
10	William T. Shepard House	William T. Shepard House	August 14, 1973 (#73000339)	Poley Rd. 31°16′44″N 86°17′50″W	Opp	Destroyed by fire in 1976.

== See also ==
- List of National Historic Landmarks in Alabama
- National Register of Historic Places listings in Alabama
