= National Register of Historic Places listings in Cleburne County, Alabama =

Location of Cleburne County in Alabama

This is a list of the National Register of Historic Places listings in Cleburne County, Alabama.

This is intended to be a complete list of the properties and districts on the National Register of Historic Places in Cleburne County, Alabama, United States. Latitude and longitude coordinates are provided for many National Register properties and districts; these locations may be seen together in a Google map.

There are four properties and districts listed on the National Register in the county.

This National Park Service list is complete through NPS recent listings posted April 24, 2026.

	Name on the Register	Image	Date listed	Location	City or town	Description
1	Cleburne County Courthouse	Cleburne County Courthouse	June 22, 1976 (#76000317)	Vickory St. 33°38′58″N 85°35′17″W	Heflin	
2	Cleburne County High School		August 13, 2018 (#100002763)	911 Willoughby St. 33°38′40″N 85°35′08″W	Heflin	The old county high school building.
3	John Morgan House	John Morgan House	August 5, 1993 (#93000762)	321 Ross St. 33°38′51″N 85°35′13″W	Heflin	
4	Shoal Creek Church	Shoal Creek Church	December 4, 1974 (#74000404)	On Forest Service Road 533 in the Talladega National Forest, 4 miles (6.4 km) northwest of Edwardsville; 33°46′32″N 85°33′50″W	Edwardsville vicinity	

== See also ==
- List of National Historic Landmarks in Alabama
- National Register of Historic Places listings in Alabama
