= National Register of Historic Places listings in Crenshaw County, Alabama =

Location of Crenshaw County in Alabama

This is a list of the National Register of Historic Places listings in Crenshaw County, Alabama.

This is intended to be a complete list of the properties and districts on the National Register of Historic Places in Crenshaw County, Alabama, United States. Latitude and longitude coordinates are provided for many National Register properties and districts; these locations may be seen together in a Google map.

There are three properties and districts listed on the National Register in the county.

This National Park Service list is complete through NPS recent listings posted January 2, 2026.

	Name on the Register	Image	Date listed	Location	City or town	Description
1	Brantley Historic District	Brantley Historic District	June 2, 2004 (#04000558)	Roughly bounded by Sasser St., Fulton Ave., Peachtree St., and Wyatt, and the former Central of Georgia railroad line 31°34′57″N 86°15′26″W	Brantley	
2	Kirkpatrick House	Kirkpatrick House	February 25, 1975 (#75000309)	West of Highland Home on U.S. Route 331; 31°57′10″N 86°18′52″W	Highland Home	Circa 1869
3	Luverne Historic District	Luverne Historic District	January 14, 2005 (#04000926)	Bounded by 1st, 6th Sts., Legrande, Glenwood, Folmar, and Hawkins Aves. 31°42′55″N 86°15′50″W	Luverne	

== See also ==
- List of National Historic Landmarks in Alabama
- National Register of Historic Places listings in Alabama
