= National Register of Historic Places listings in Chambers County, Alabama =

Location of Chambers County in Alabama

This is a list of the National Register of Historic Places listings in Chambers County, Alabama.

This is intended to be a complete list of the properties and districts on the National Register of Historic Places in Chambers County, Alabama, United States. Latitude and longitude coordinates are provided for many National Register properties and districts; these locations may be seen together in a Google map.

There are 10 properties and districts listed on the National Register in the county.

This National Park Service list is complete through NPS recent listings posted January 2, 2026.

	Name on the Register	Image	Date listed	Location	City or town	Description
1	Bethlehem Baptist Church	Bethlehem Baptist Church	December 7, 2017 (#100001875)	Southern corner of River and White's Mill Rds. 32°47′19″N 85°10′35″W	Valley	
2	Chambers County Courthouse Square Historic District	Chambers County Courthouse Square Historic District	March 27, 1980 (#80000682)	Roughly bounded by Alabama and 2nd Aves. and 1st St. 32°53′58″N 85°24′03″W	La Fayette	
3	County Line Baptist Church	County Line Baptist Church	August 19, 1982 (#82002001)	East of Dudleyville; 32°55′04″N 85°35′23″W	Dudleyville	Erected c. 1890
4	Fairfax Historic District	Fairfax Historic District	September 24, 1999 (#99001177)	Roughly bounded by River Rd., Spring St., Lanier St., Denson St., Combs St., and Cussetta Rd. 32°47′35″N 85°10′51″W	Valley	
5	Langdale Historic District	Langdale Historic District	November 12, 1999 (#99001299)	Roughly bounded by 65th St., 20th Ave., 61st, 58th, and 55th Sts., 16th Ave., and the Chattahoochee River; 32°48′43″N 85°10′13″W	Valley	
6	New Hope Rosenwald School	New Hope Rosenwald School	November 29, 2001 (#01001297)	2.25 miles southeast of U.S. Route 431 on County Road 267; 32°56′36″N 85°17′08″W	Fredonia	
7	Ernest McCarty Oliver House	Ernest McCarty Oliver House	January 21, 1974 (#74000402)	313 N. LaFayette St./U.S. Route 431; 32°54′24″N 85°24′09″W	La Fayette	Large Victorian brick house, built from brick fired on site, facing east onto LaFayette St. N.
8	Riverview Historic District	Riverview Historic District	November 12, 1999 (#99001300)	Roughly bounded by School and G.I. Sts., the Chattahoochee River, and along California St. 32°47′14″N 85°08′45″W	River View	
9	Shawmut Historic District	Shawmut Historic District	September 24, 1999 (#99001176)	Roughly bounded by 25th Boulevard, 29th Boulevard, 20th Ave., 35th St., and 38th Boulevard; 32°50′25″N 85°11′00″W	Valley	
10	Vines Funeral Home and Ambulance Service	Vines Funeral Home and Ambulance Service	October 15, 2008 (#08000434)	211 B St. SW. 32°53′30″N 85°24′14″W	La Fayette	

== See also ==
- List of National Historic Landmarks in Alabama
- National Register of Historic Places listings in Alabama
