= National Register of Historic Places listings in Blount County, Alabama =

Location of Blount County in Alabama

This is a list of the National Register of Historic Places listings in Blount County, Alabama.

This is intended to be a complete list of the properties and districts on the National Register of Historic Places in Blount County, Alabama, United States. Latitude and longitude coordinates are provided for many National Register properties and districts; these locations may be seen together in a Google map.

There are five properties and districts listed on the National Register in the county.

This National Park Service list is complete through NPS recent listings posted January 2, 2026.

	Name on the Register	Image	Date listed	Location	City or town	Description
1	Easley Covered Bridge	Easley Covered Bridge	August 20, 1981 (#81000125)	Spans Dub Branch; 33°58′15″N 86°31′06″W	Oneonta	
2	Robert G. Griffith Sr. House	Robert G. Griffith Sr. House	March 14, 2000 (#00000143)	1204 County Road 25; 34°12′38″N 86°28′38″W	Summit	
3	Horton Mill Covered Bridge	Horton Mill Covered Bridge	December 29, 1970 (#70000099)	5 miles (8 km) north of Oneonta on Route 3; 34°00′58″N 86°26′55″W	Oneonta	
4	Nectar Covered Bridge	Nectar Covered Bridge	August 20, 1981 (#81000124)	8 miles southwest of Nectar; 33°57′22″N 86°37′34″W	Nectar	Bridge burned down on June 13, 1993.
5	Swann Covered Bridge	Swann Covered Bridge	August 20, 1981 (#81000123)	West of Cleveland; 33°59′50″N 86°36′06″W	Cleveland	

== See also ==
- List of National Historic Landmarks in Alabama
- National Register of Historic Places listings in Alabama
