= National Register of Historic Places listings in Fayette County, Alabama =

Location of Fayette County in Alabama

This is a list of the National Register of Historic Places listings in Fayette County, Alabama.

This is intended to be a complete list of the properties and districts on the National Register of Historic Places in Fayette County, Alabama, United States. Latitude and longitude coordinates are provided for many National Register properties and districts; these locations may be seen together in a Google map.

There are three properties and districts listed on the National Register in the county.

This National Park Service list is complete through NPS recent listings posted January 16, 2026.

	Name on the Register	Image	Date listed	Location	City or town	Description
1	Fayette County Courthouse Historic District	Fayette County Courthouse Historic District	April 30, 1976 (#76000326)	Roughly the area between Peyton and Caine Sts., and Luxapalilla St. and the railroad tracks 33°41′05″N 87°49′52″W	Fayette	Boundary increase on 2014-03-26
2	John Clifford Grimsley House		August 3, 2018 (#16000834)	432 10th St. 33°41′51″N 87°49′59″W	Fayette	
3	Edward Rose House		August 22, 1995 (#95001020)	325 2nd Ave., NW. 33°41′17″N 87°50′02″W	Fayette	

== See also ==
- List of National Historic Landmarks in Alabama
- National Register of Historic Places listings in Alabama
