= National Register of Historic Places listings in Washington County, Alabama =

Location of Washington County in Alabama

This is a list of the National Register of Historic Places listings in Washington County, Alabama.

This is intended to be a complete list of the properties and districts on the National Register of Historic Places in Washington County, Alabama, United States. Latitude and longitude coordinates are provided for many National Register properties and districts; these locations may be seen together in a Google map.

There are three properties and districts listed on the National Register in the county.

This National Park Service list is complete through NPS recent listings posted May 1, 2026.

	Name on the Register	Image	Date listed	Location	City or town	Description
1	McIntosh Log Church	McIntosh Log Church	November 20, 1974 (#74000439)	South of McIntosh off U.S. Route 43; 31°15′44″N 88°01′49″W	McIntosh	
2	Old St. Stephens Site	Old St. Stephens Site	December 29, 1970 (#70000111)	Address Restricted	St. Stephens	
3	Washington County Courthouse	Washington County Courthouse	July 3, 1997 (#97000655)	County Road 34, 0.5 miles southeast of its junction with Old Stephens Rd. 31°32′24″N 88°03′15″W	St. Stephens	

== See also ==
- List of National Historic Landmarks in Alabama
- National Register of Historic Places listings in Alabama
