= National Register of Historic Places listings in Bullock County, Alabama =

Location of Bullock County in Alabama

This is a list of the National Register of Historic Places listings in Bullock County, Alabama.

This is intended to be a complete list of the properties and districts on the National Register of Historic Places in Bullock County, Alabama, United States. Latitude and longitude coordinates are provided for many National Register properties and districts; these locations may be seen together in a Google map.

There are four properties and districts listed on the National Register in the county.

This National Park Service list is complete through NPS recent listings posted January 2, 2026.

	Name on the Register	Image	Date listed	Location	City or town	Description
1	Bullock County Courthouse Historic District	Bullock County Courthouse Historic District	October 8, 1976 (#76000312)	N. Prairie St. 32°08′43″N 85°42′59″W	Union Springs	
2	Foster House	Foster House	August 14, 1998 (#98001021)	201 Kennon St. 32°08′41″N 85°43′17″W	Union Springs	
3	Merritt School	Merritt School	February 20, 1998 (#98000110)	Old Troy Rd., 0.5 miles south of U.S. Route 82; 32°04′29″N 85°32′03″W	Midway	The Old Merritt School is a Rosenwald School that was built in 1922.
4	Sardis Baptist Church	Sardis Baptist Church	November 29, 2001 (#01001299)	State Route 223S at its junction with County Road 22; 32°05′18″N 85°45′44″W	Union Springs vicinity	The Sardis Baptist Church was founded on June 10, 1837. The present building was erected in 1850.

== See also ==
- List of National Historic Landmarks in Alabama
- National Register of Historic Places listings in Alabama
