= National Register of Historic Places listings in Conecuh County, Alabama =

Location of Conecuh County in Alabama

This is a list of the National Register of Historic Places listings in Conecuh County, Alabama.

This is intended to be a complete list of the properties and districts on the National Register of Historic Places in Conecuh County, Alabama, United States. Latitude and longitude coordinates are provided for many National Register properties and districts; these locations may be seen together in a Google map.

There are four properties and districts listed on the National Register in the county.

This National Park Service list is complete through NPS recent listings posted January 2, 2026.

	Name on the Register	Image	Date listed	Location	City or town	Description
1	Evergreen School	Evergreen School	June 22, 2016 (#16000398)	100 City School Dr. 31°26′09″N 86°57′03″W	Evergreen	
2	Asa Johnston Farmhouse	Asa Johnston Farmhouse	May 21, 2008 (#08000455)	County Road 29 0.6 miles northwest of its junction with County Road 6; 31°17′07″N 86°52′01″W	Johnsonville	
3	Louisville and Nashville Depot	Louisville and Nashville Depot	April 3, 1975 (#75000308)	Southwestern end of Front St. 31°26′02″N 86°57′31″W	Evergreen	
4	New Evergreen Commercial Historic District	New Evergreen Commercial Historic District	January 21, 1994 (#93001542)	Roughly bounded by Mill, Cooper, Rural, Court, Liberty, E. Front, Cary, and Despious Sts. 31°26′03″N 86°57′17″W	Evergreen	

== See also ==
- List of National Historic Landmarks in Alabama
- National Register of Historic Places listings in Alabama
