= National Register of Historic Places listings in Pike County, Alabama =

Location of Pike County in Alabama

This is a list of the National Register of Historic Places listings in Pike County, Alabama.

This is intended to be a complete list of the properties and districts on the National Register of Historic Places in Pike County, Alabama, United States. Latitude and longitude coordinates are provided for many National Register properties and districts; these locations may be seen together in an online map.

There are three properties and districts listed on the National Register in the county.

This National Park Service list is complete through NPS recent listings posted January 30, 2026.

	Name on the Register	Image	Date listed	Location	City or town	Description
1	College Street Historic District	College Street Historic District	August 13, 1976 (#76000352)	W. College St. between Pine and Cherry Sts. 31°48′35″N 85°58′31″W	Troy	
2	Troy High School	Troy High School	August 30, 1984 (#84000721)	436 Elm St. 31°48′30″N 85°57′56″W	Troy	The building was demolished in 2010. A public library is planned to be built on the site.
3	Troy Masonic Temple		November 13, 2024 (#100011023)	200 N. Three Notch Street; 31°48′31″N 85°58′20″W	Troy	

== See also ==
- List of National Historic Landmarks in Alabama
- National Register of Historic Places listings in Alabama
