= National Register of Historic Places listings in Autauga County, Alabama =

Location of Autauga County in Alabama

This is a list of the National Register of Historic Places listings in Autauga County, Alabama.

This is intended to be a complete list of the properties and districts on the National Register of Historic Places in Autauga County, Alabama, United States. Latitude and longitude coordinates are provided for many National Register properties and districts; these locations may be seen together in a Google map.

There are five properties and districts listed on the National Register in the county.

This National Park Service list is complete through NPS recent listings posted January 2, 2026.

| | Name on the Register | Image | Date listed | Location | City or town | Description |
|---|---|---|---|---|---|---|
| 1 | Bell House | Bell House | February 12, 1999 (#99000150) | 550 Upper Kingston Rd. 32°28′17″N 86°28′40″W | Prattville | Queen Anne style house built in 1893 |
| 2 | Daniel Pratt Historic District | Daniel Pratt Historic District | August 30, 1984 (#84000596) | Roughly bounded by Northington Rd. and 1st, 6th, Bridge, and Court Sts. 32°27′41″N 86°28′20″W | Prattville | |
| 3 | Lassiter House | Lassiter House | July 17, 1997 (#97000651) | County Road 15, 0.5 miles north of its junction with State Route 14; 32°28′20″N 86°48′18″W | Autaugaville | An I-house from 1825 |
| 4 | Montgomery-Janes-Whittaker House | Montgomery-Janes-Whittaker House | October 25, 1974 (#74000396) | South of Prattville off State Route 14; 32°25′28″N 86°27′07″W | Prattville | |
| 5 | Mount Sinai School | Mount Sinai School | November 29, 2001 (#01001296) | 1820 County Road 57; 32°33′01″N 86°32′43″W | Prattville | |

== See also ==
- List of National Historic Landmarks in Alabama
- National Register of Historic Places listings in Alabama
