= National Register of Historic Places listings in Coosa County, Alabama =

Location of Coosa County in Alabama

This is a list of the National Register of Historic Places listings in Coosa County, Alabama.

This is intended to be a complete list of the properties and districts on the National Register of Historic Places in Coosa County, Alabama, United States. Latitude and longitude coordinates are provided for many National Register properties and districts; these locations may be seen together in an online map.

There are two properties listed on the National Register in the county, and one former listing.

This National Park Service list is complete through NPS recent listings posted January 2, 2026.

	Name on the Register	Image	Date listed	Location	City or town	Description
1	Coosa County Jail	Coosa County Jail	June 20, 1974 (#74000407)	Off State Route 22; 32°53′25″N 86°13′13″W	Rockford	
2	State Park No. 4-Weogufka State Park		November 14, 2024 (#100010427)	CCC Camp Road approx., 1.3 miles (2.1 km) southeast of intersection with Lay Dam Road; 32°59′00″N 86°21′12″W	Weogufka vicinity	

== Former listing ==
	Name on the Register	Image	Date listed	Date removed	Location	City or town	Description
1	Oakachoy Covered Bridge		June 14, 1990 (#90000928)	September 23, 2001	Over Oakachoy Cr. W of SR 259	Nixburg vicinity	Bridge burned down on June 2, 2001.

== See also ==
- List of National Historic Landmarks in Alabama
- National Register of Historic Places listings in Alabama
