= National Register of Historic Places listings in Cherokee County, Alabama =

Location of Cherokee County in Alabama

This is a list of the National Register of Historic Places listings in Cherokee County, Alabama.

This is intended to be a complete list of the properties and districts on the National Register of Historic Places in Cherokee County, Alabama, United States. Latitude and longitude coordinates are provided for many National Register properties and districts; these locations may be seen together in a Google map.

There is one property listed on the National Register in the county.

This National Park Service list is complete through NPS recent listings posted January 2, 2026.

	Name on the Register	Image	Date listed	Location	City or town	Description
1	Cornwall Furnace	Cornwall Furnace	September 27, 1972 (#72000158)	2 miles (3.2 km) north of Cedar Bluff; 34°14′49″N 85°35′19″W	Cedar Bluff	

== See also ==
- List of National Historic Landmarks in Alabama
- National Register of Historic Places listings in Alabama
