= National Register of Historic Places listings in Marion County, Alabama =

Location of Marion County in Alabama

This is a list of the National Register of Historic Places listings in Marion County, Alabama.

This is intended to be a complete list of the properties and districts on the National Register of Historic Places in Marion County, Alabama, United States. Latitude and longitude coordinates are provided for many National Register properties and districts; these locations may be seen together in a Google map.

There are two properties and districts listed on the National Register in the county.

This National Park Service list is complete through NPS recent listings posted January 16, 2026.

	Name on the Register	Image	Date listed	Location	City or town	Description
1	Ernest Baxter Fite House	Ernest Baxter Fite House	August 28, 1997 (#94001545)	Junction of Jackson Military Rd. and Thomas St. 34°08′00″N 87°59′27″W	Hamilton	
2	Pearce's Mill		October 8, 1976 (#76000343)	East of Hamilton on State Route 253; 34°07′19″N 87°50′14″W	Hamilton	

== See also ==
- List of National Historic Landmarks in Alabama
- National Register of Historic Places listings in Alabama
