= National Register of Historic Places listings in Lamar County, Alabama =

Location of Lamar County in Alabama

This is a list of the National Register of Historic Places listings in Lamar County, Alabama.

This is intended to be a complete list of the properties and districts on the National Register of Historic Places in Lamar County, Alabama, United States. Latitude and longitude coordinates are provided for many National Register properties and districts; these locations may be seen together in a Google map.

There is one property listed on the National Register in the county.

This National Park Service list is complete through NPS recent listings posted January 16, 2026.

	Name on the Register	Image	Date listed	Location	City or town	Description
1	James Greer Bankhead House	James Greer Bankhead House	February 13, 1975 (#75000316)	Wolf Rd. 33°54′17″N 88°07′18″W	Sulligent	

== See also ==
- List of National Historic Landmarks in Alabama
- National Register of Historic Places listings in Alabama
