= National Register of Historic Places listings in Alabama =

This is a list of buildings, sites, districts, and objects listed on the National Register of Historic Places in Alabama.

This National Park Service list is complete through NPS recent listings posted November 13, 2026.

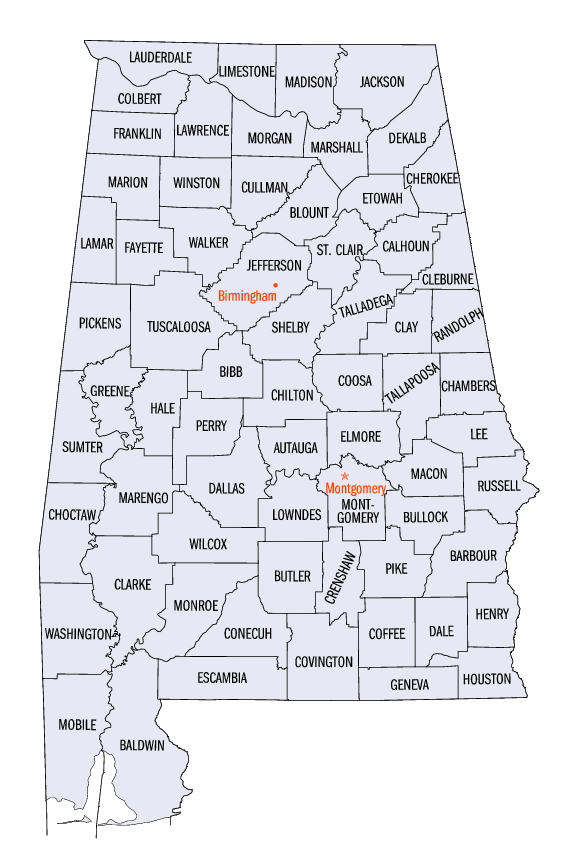
Alabama counties (clickable map)

Contents: Counties in Alabama
Autauga - Baldwin - Barbour - Bibb - Blount - Bullock - Butler - Calhoun - Chambers - Cherokee - Chilton - Choctaw - Clarke - Clay - Cleburne - Coffee - Colbert - Conecuh - Coosa - Covington - Crenshaw - Cullman - Dale - Dallas - DeKalb - Elmore - Escambia - Etowah - Fayette - Franklin - Geneva - Greene - Hale - Henry - Houston - Jackson - Jefferson (Birmingham) - Lamar - Lauderdale - Lawrence - Lee - Limestone - Lowndes - Macon - Madison - Marengo - Marion - Marshall - Mobile (Mobile) - Monroe - Montgomery - Morgan - Perry - Pickens - Pike - Randolph - Russell - St. Clair - Shelby - Sumter - Talladega - Tallapoosa - Tuscaloosa - Walker - Washington - Wilcox - Winston

== Numbers of properties and districts ==
There are approximately 1,200 properties and districts listed on the National Register of Historic Places in Alabama. The numbers of properties and districts in Alabama or in any of its 67 counties are not directly reported by the National Register. Following are tallies of current listings from lists of the specific properties and districts. (Note: These counts are the best available. There are frequent additions to the listings, and occasional delistings, and the counts here may not be perfectly updated. Also, not counted are most boundary increase listings, which increase the area covered by a historic district and which carry a separate National Register reference number.)

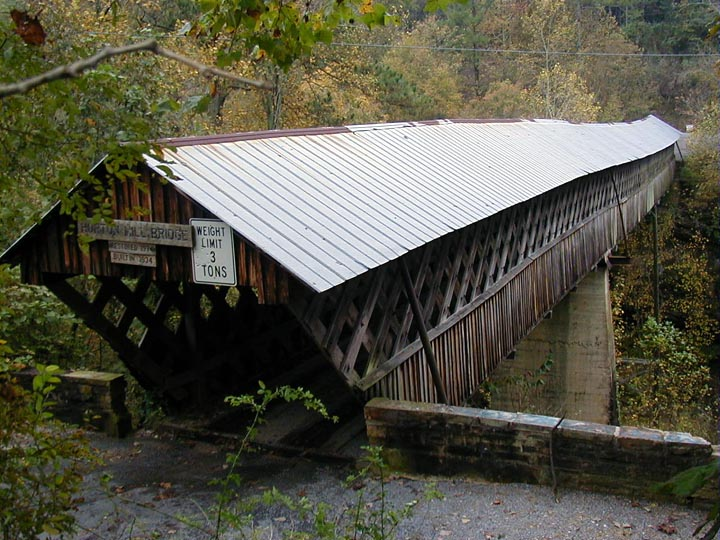
Horton Mill Covered Bridge in Blount County

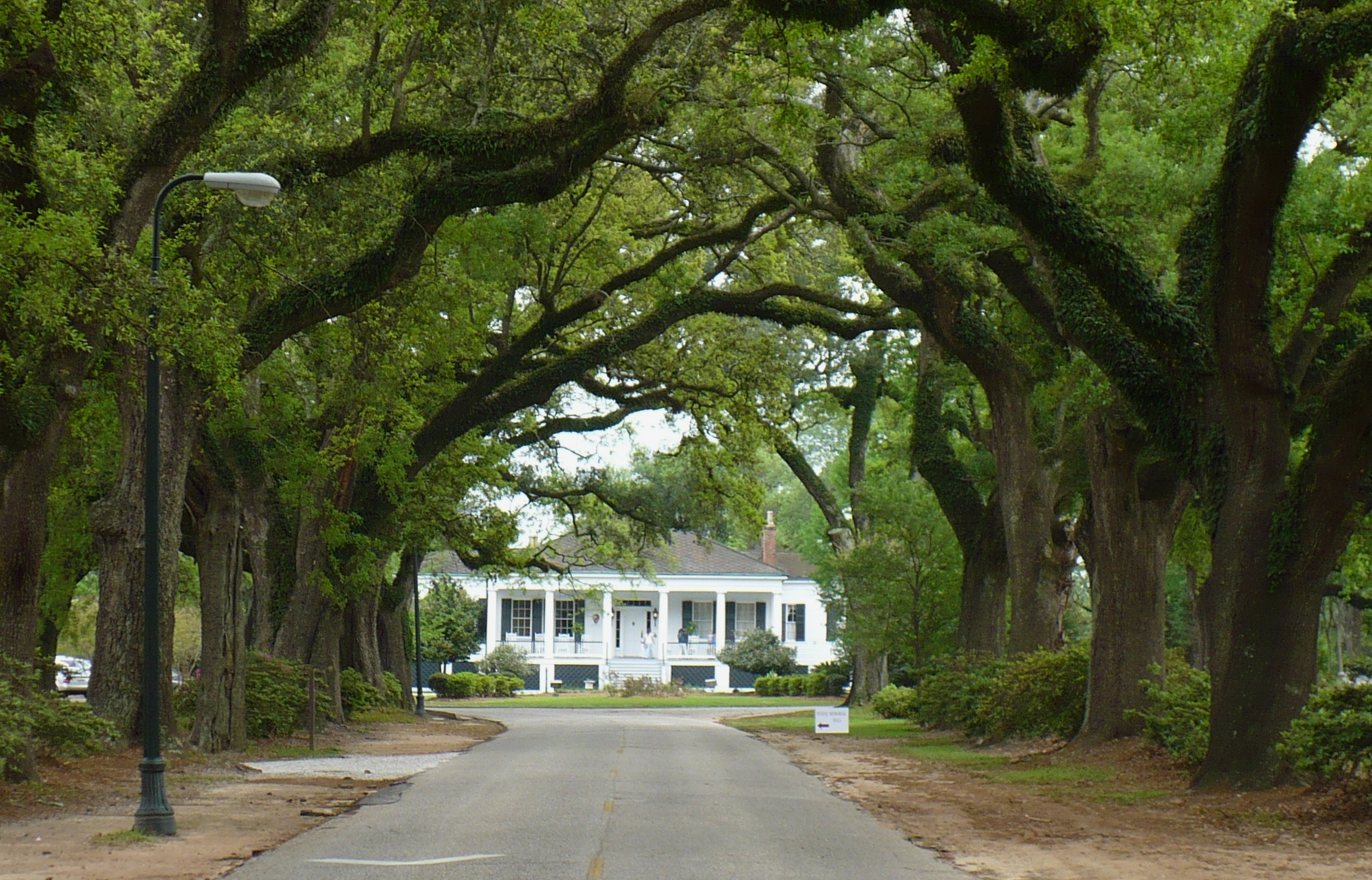
Stewartfield in Mobile

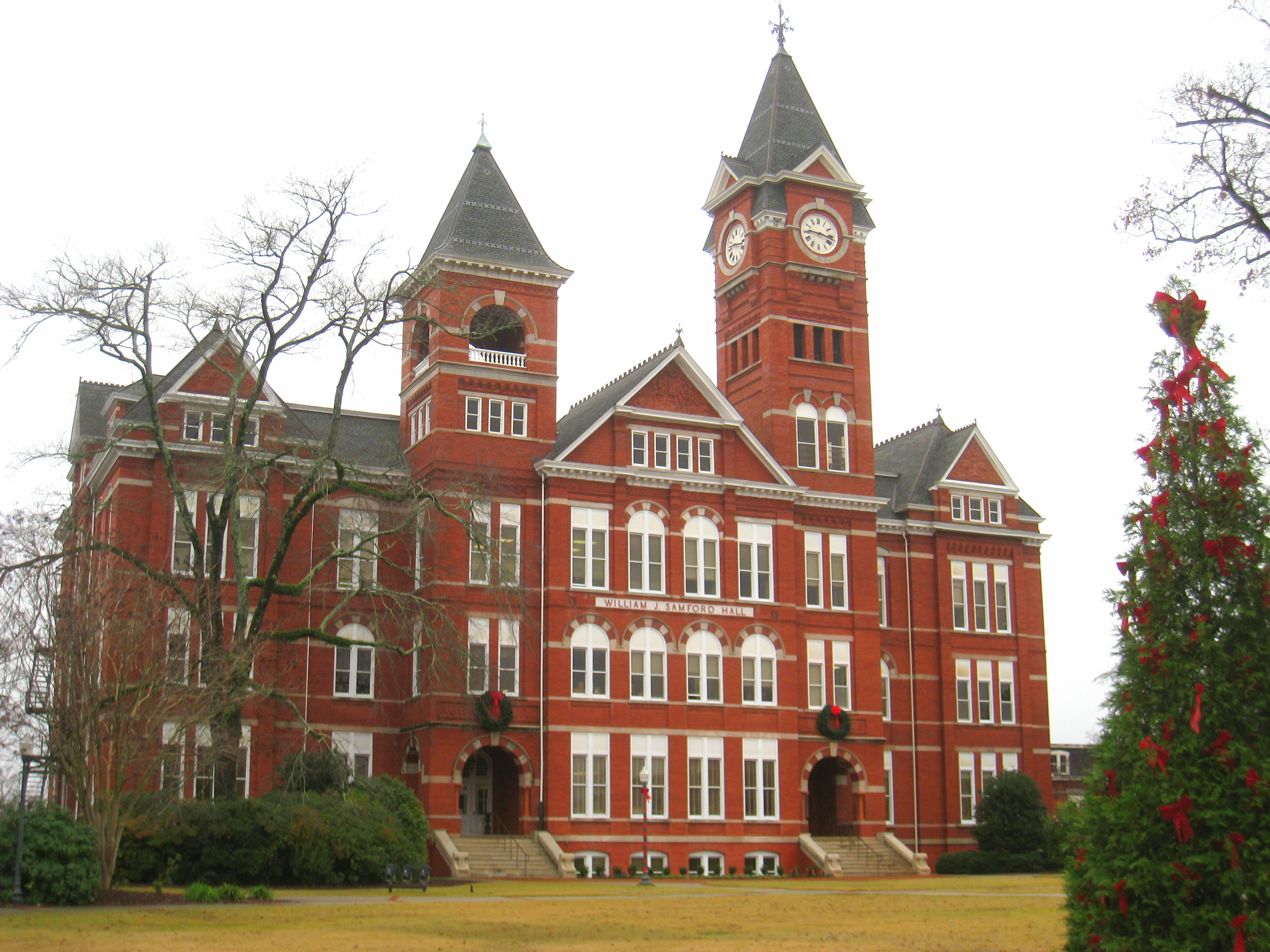
William J. Samford Hall in the Auburn University Historic District

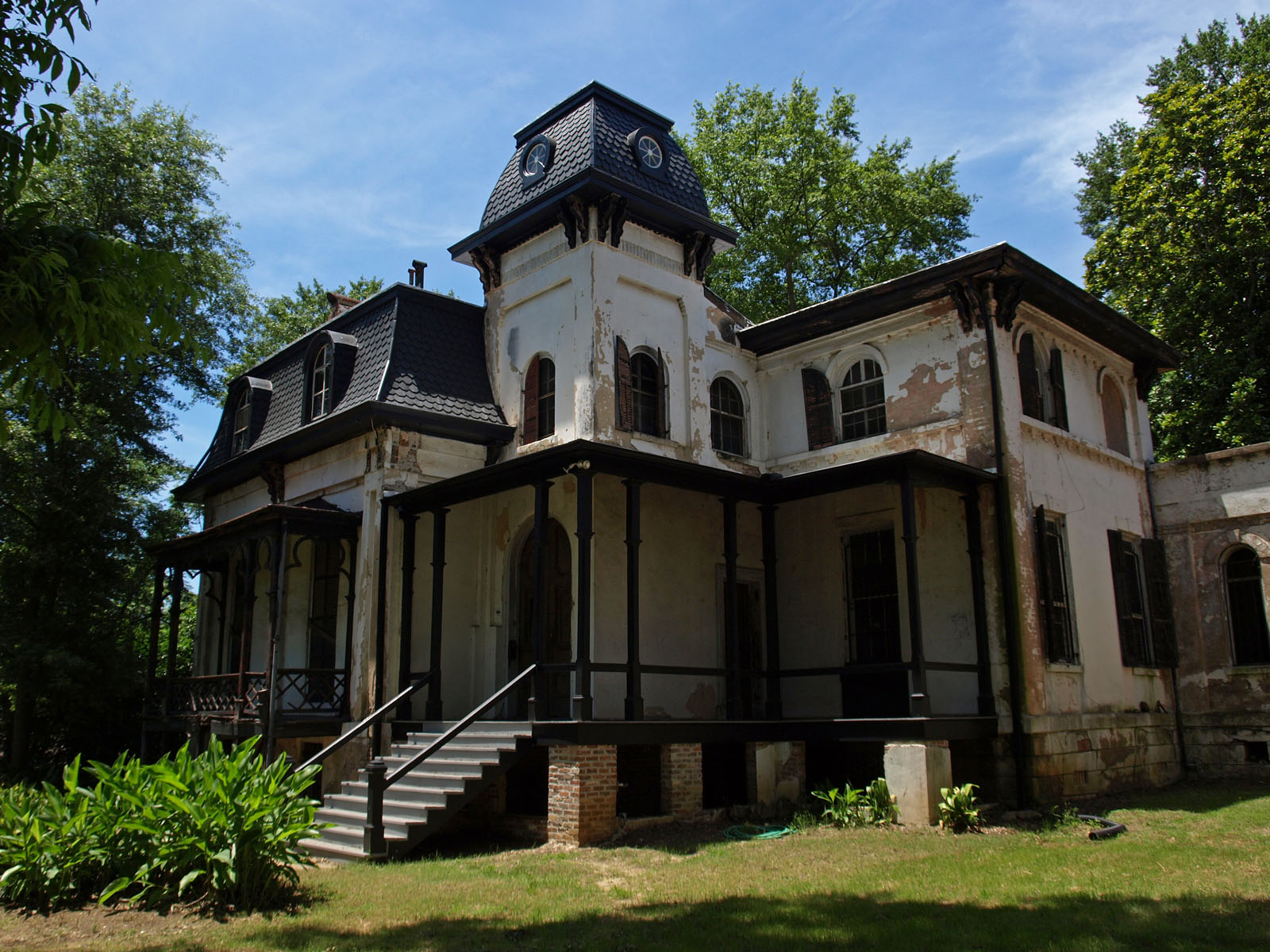
Winter Place in Montgomery

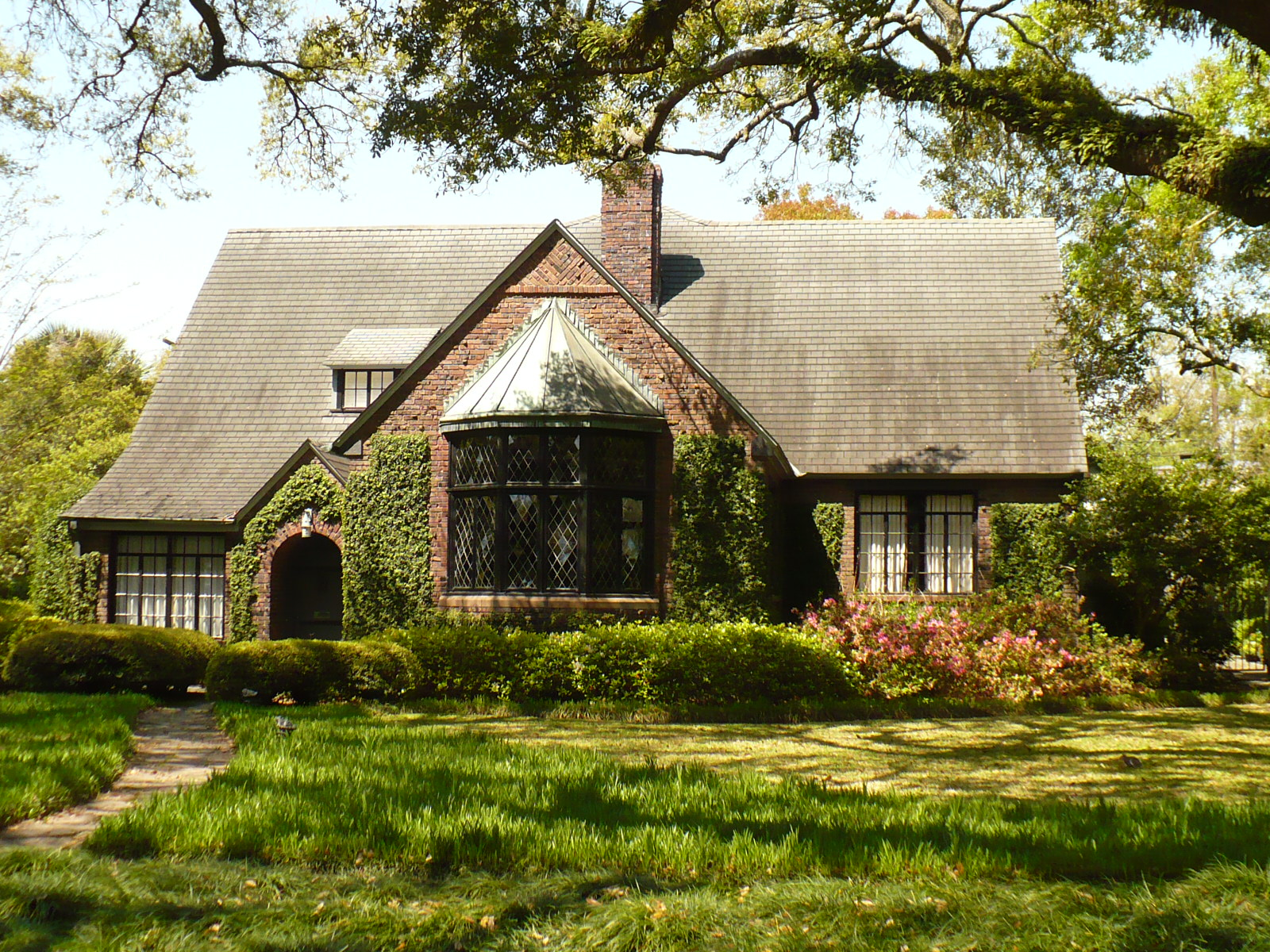
Ashland Place Historic District in Mobile

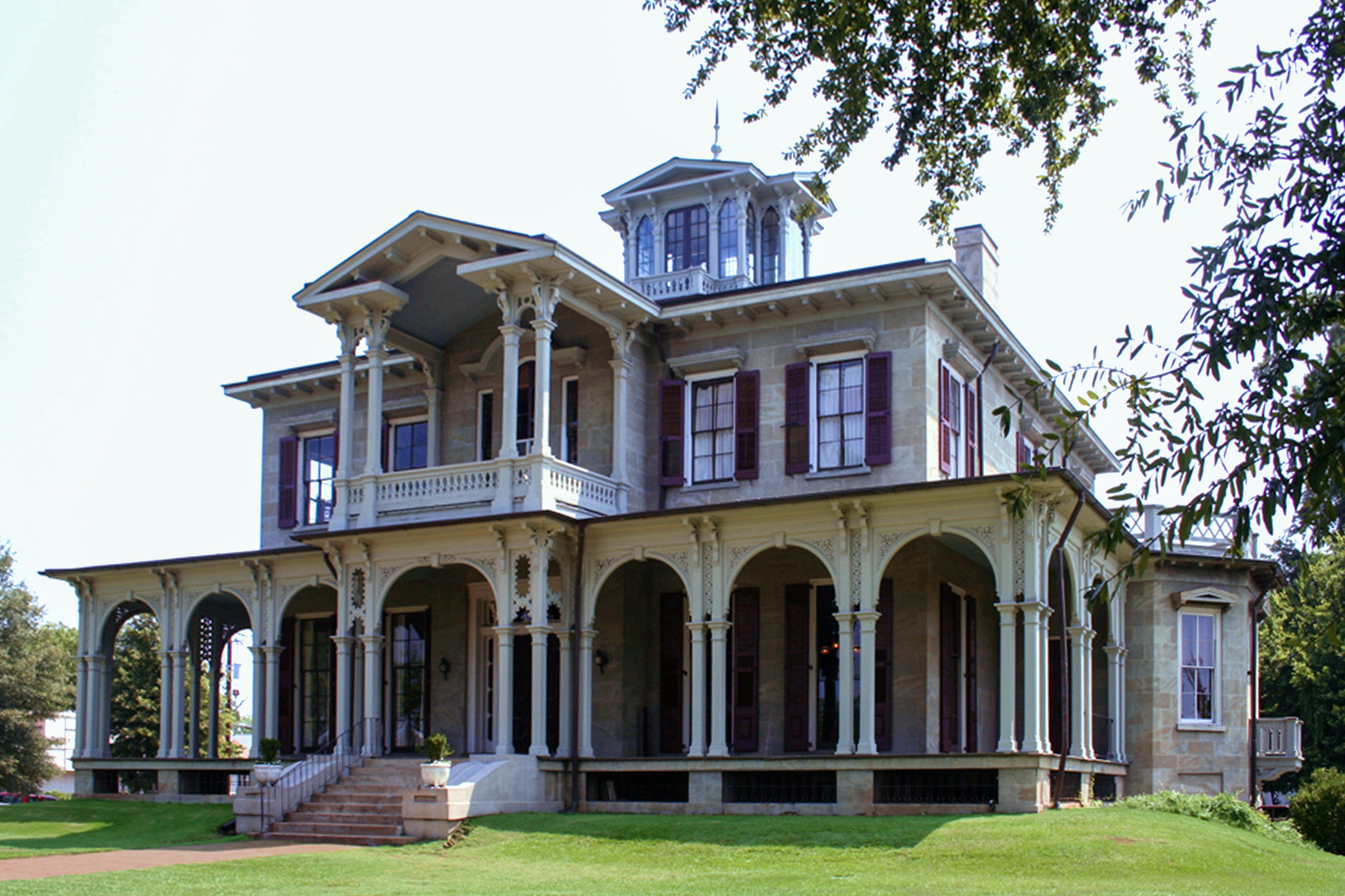
Jemison-Van de Graaff Mansion in Tuscaloosa

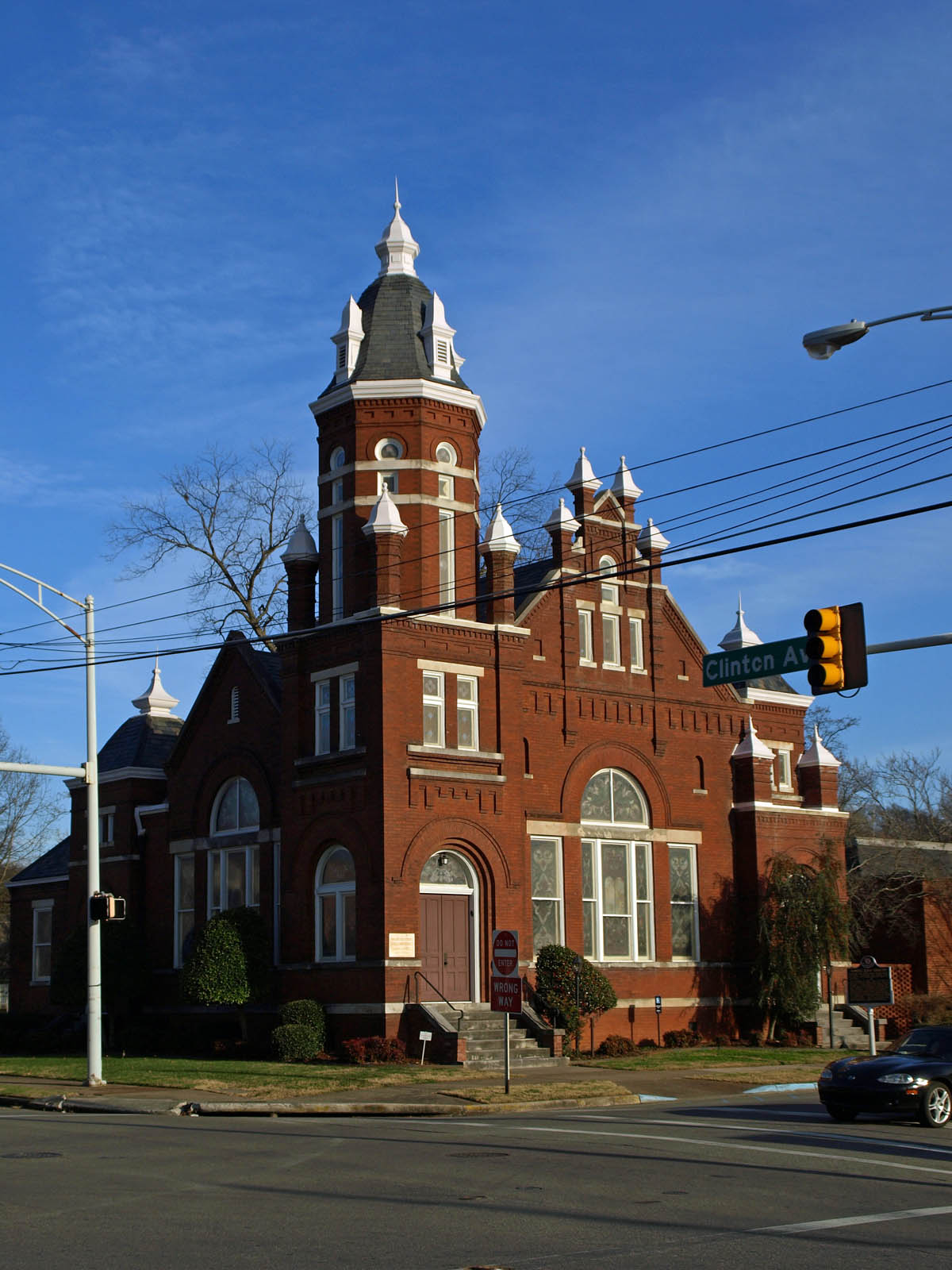
Temple B'nai Shalom in Huntsville's Old Town Historic District, in Huntsville

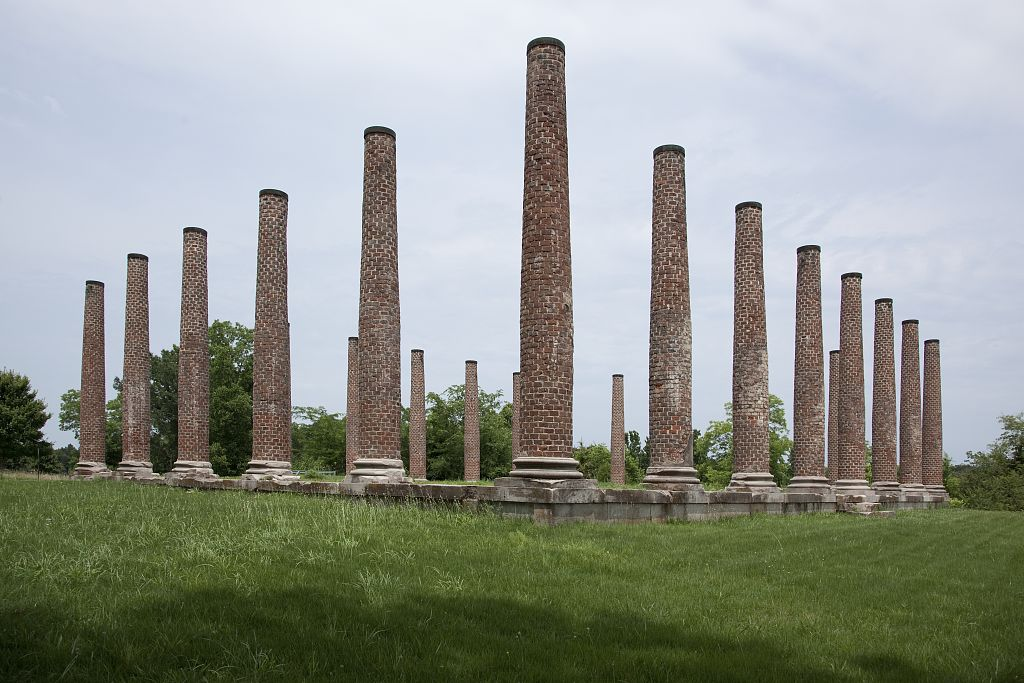
"Forks of Cypress" ruins near Florence

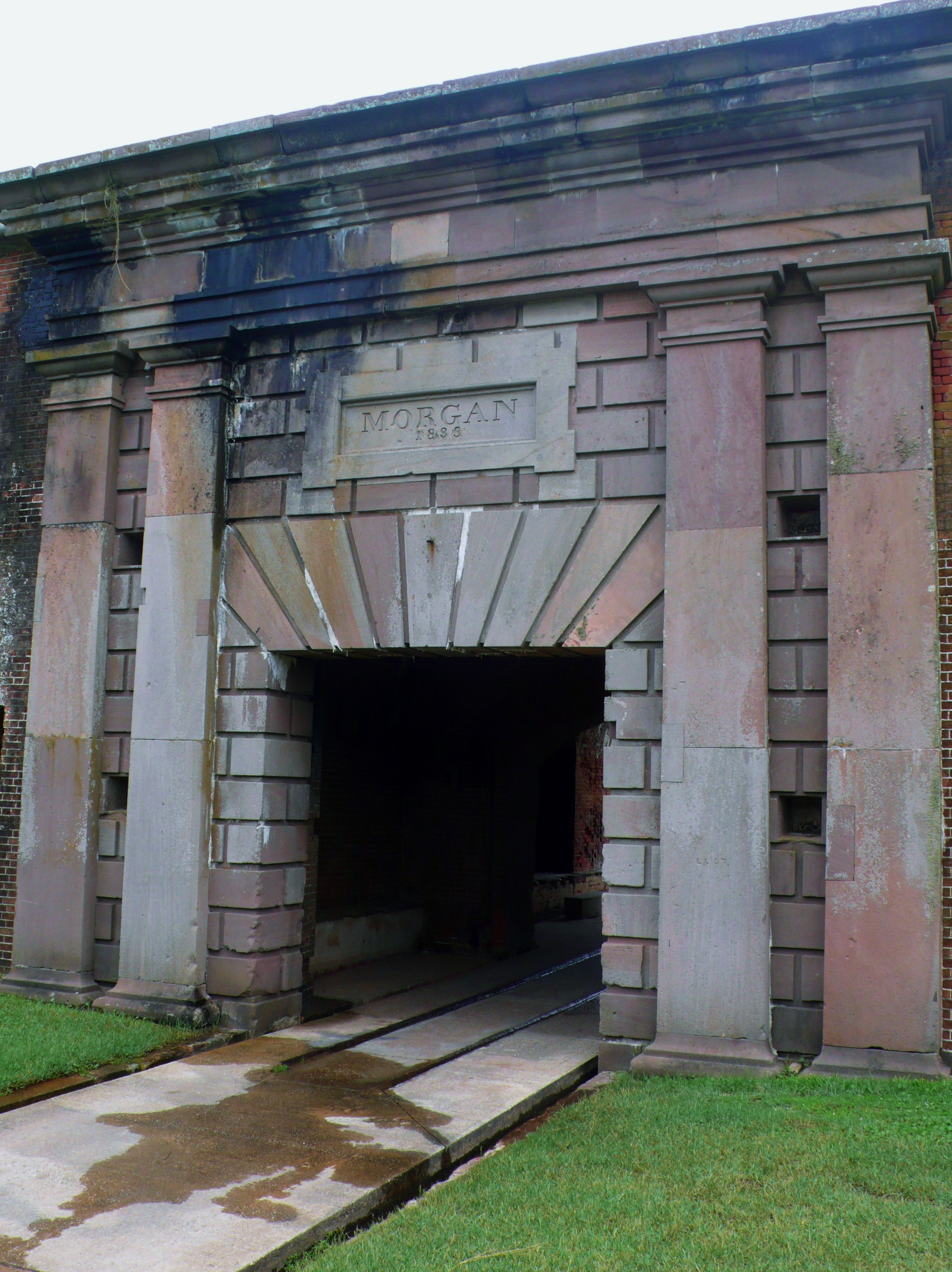
Fort Morgan, on shore of Mobile Bay in Baldwin County, attacked by Union Navy fleet under Adm. David Farragut in 1864 during Battle of Mobile Bay of the American Civil War

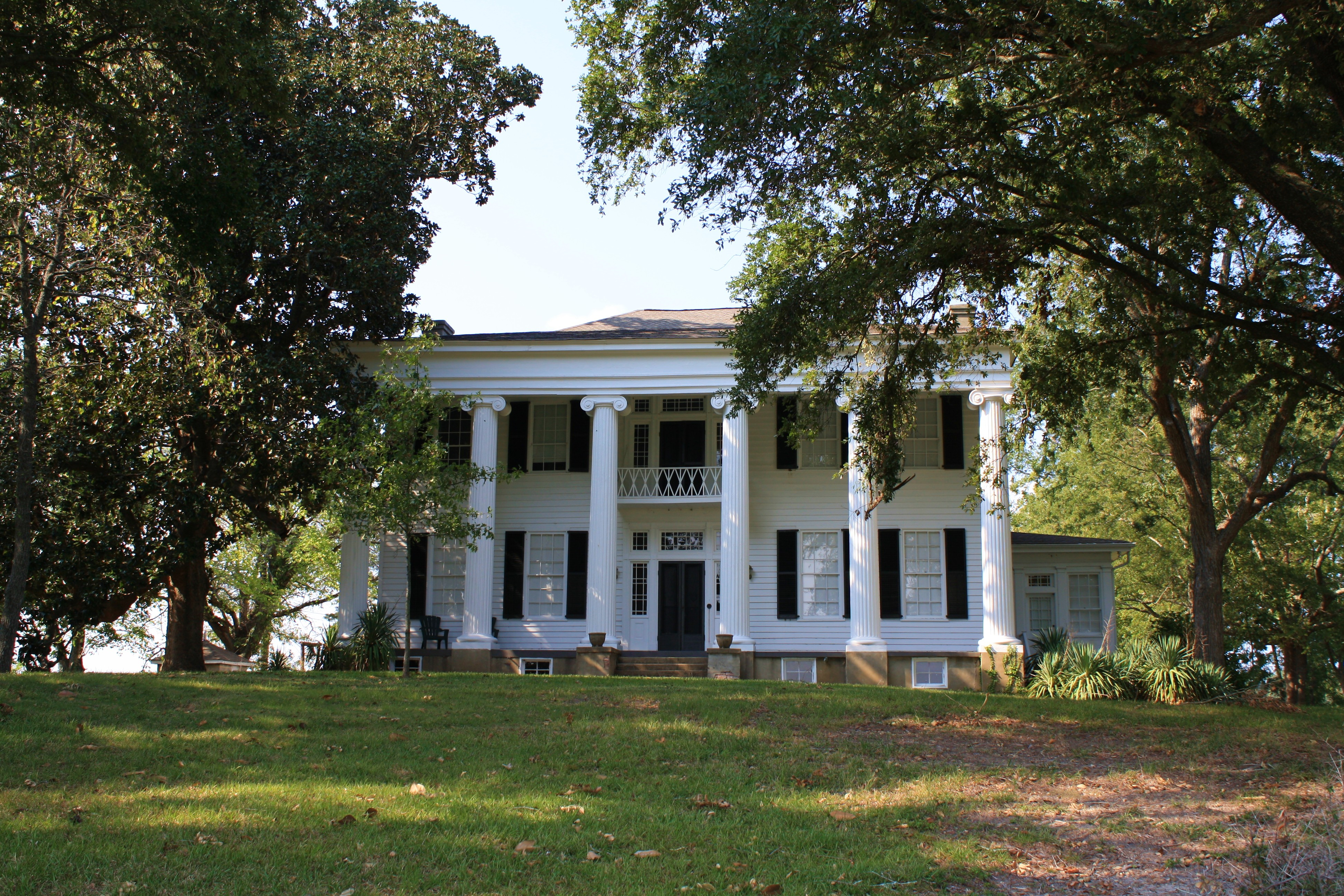
Thornhill in Greene County

	County	Number of properties and districts
1	Autauga	5
2	Baldwin	65
3	Barbour	19
4	Bibb	6
5	Blount	5
6	Bullock	4
7	Butler	31
8	Calhoun	60
9	Chambers	10
10	Cherokee	1
11	Chilton	3
12	Choctaw	1
13	Clarke	21
14	Clay	2
15	Cleburne	4
16	Coffee	5
17	Colbert	32
18	Conecuh	4
19	Coosa	2
20	Covington	10
21	Crenshaw	3
22	Cullman	9
23	Dale	4
24	Dallas	34
25	DeKalb	12
26	Elmore	13
27	Escambia	3
28	Etowah	15
29	Fayette	3
30	Franklin	3
31	Geneva	2
32	Greene	35
33	Hale	21
34	Henry	4
35	Houston	13
36	Jackson	12
37.1	Jefferson: Birmingham	148
37.2	Jefferson: Other	31
37.3	Jefferson: Duplicates	(1) (Note: Red Mountain Suburbs Historic District is split between Birmingham and Mountain Brook.)
37.4	Jefferson: Total	178
38	Lamar	1
39	Lauderdale	33
40	Lawrence	12
41	Lee	26
42	Limestone	13
43	Lowndes	7
44	Macon	16
45	Madison	90
46	Marengo	28
47	Marion	2
48	Marshall	15
49.1	Mobile: Mobile	114
49.2	Mobile: Other	24
49.3	Mobile: Total	138
50	Monroe	7
51	Montgomery	70
52	Morgan	19
53	Perry	19
54	Pickens	7
55	Pike	3
56	Randolph	3
57	Russell	25
58	St. Clair	15
59	Shelby	12
60	Sumter	14
61	Talladega	25
62	Tallapoosa	9
63	Tuscaloosa	40
64	Walker	8
65	Washington	3
66	Wilcox	15
67	Winston	4
(duplicates)		(2) (Note: The following sites are listed in multiple counties: Seven Mile Island Archeological District (Colbert and Lauderdale), Wilson Dam (Colbert and Lauderdale).)
Total:		1,331

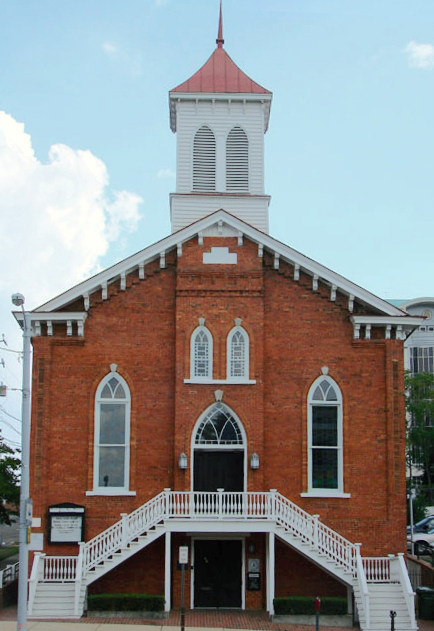
Dexter Avenue Baptist Church, first church of the Rev. Dr. Martin Luther King Jr. when he began his work as a national civil rights activist, in 1955 with the Montgomery bus boycott in Montgomery

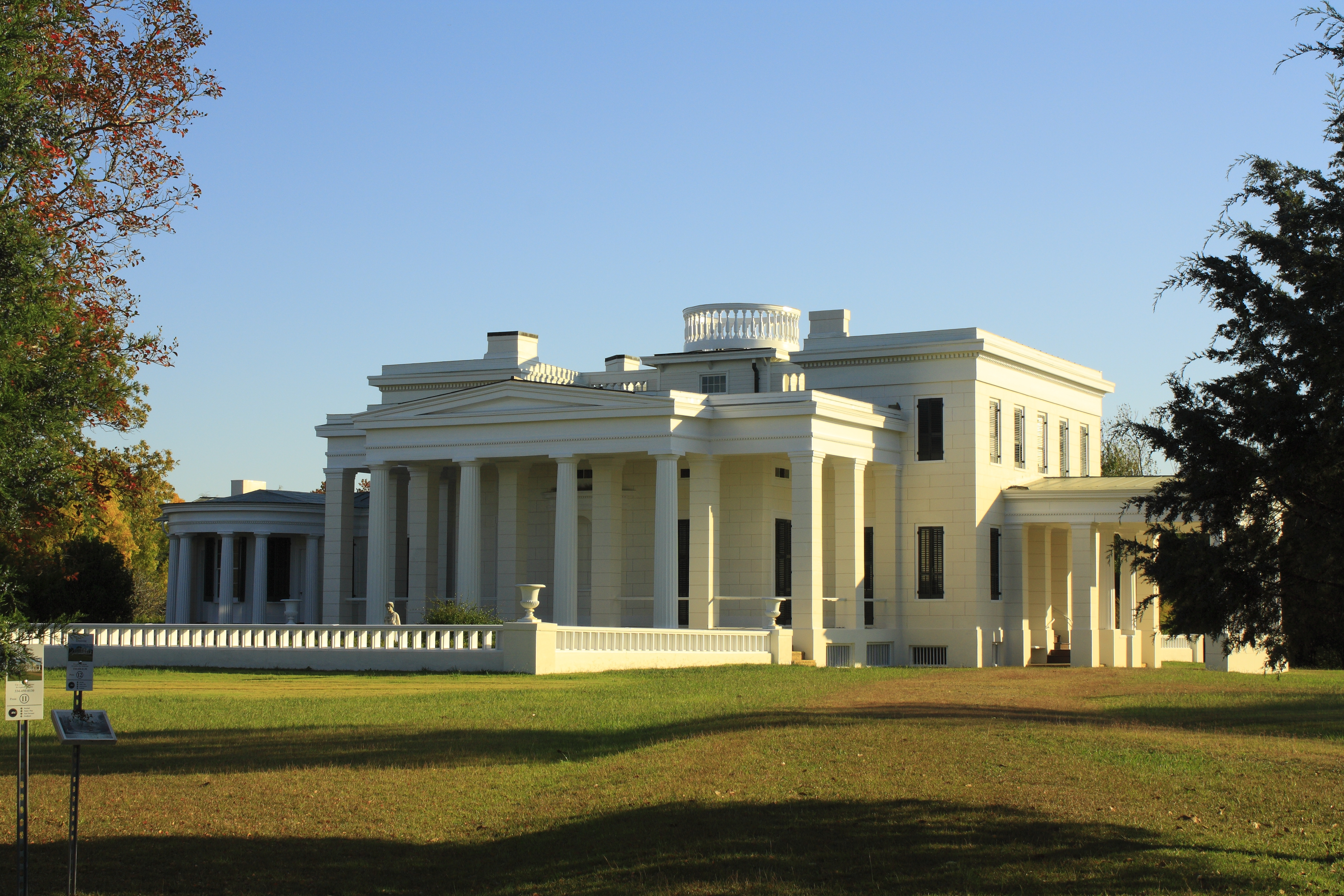
Gaineswood in Demopolis

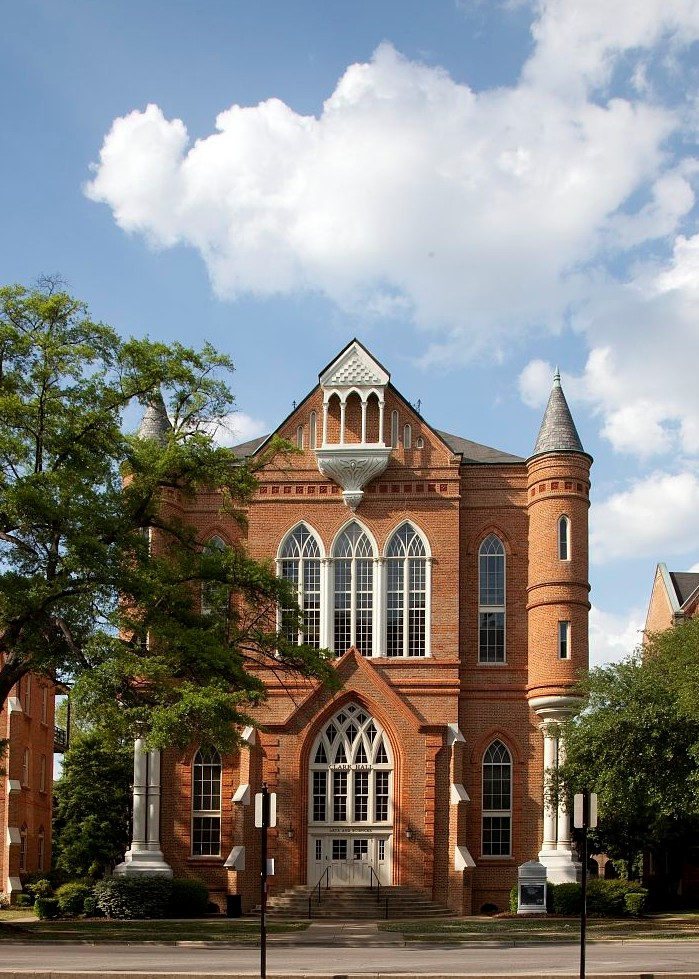
Clark Hall in the Gorgas–Manly Historic District on the University of Alabama campus

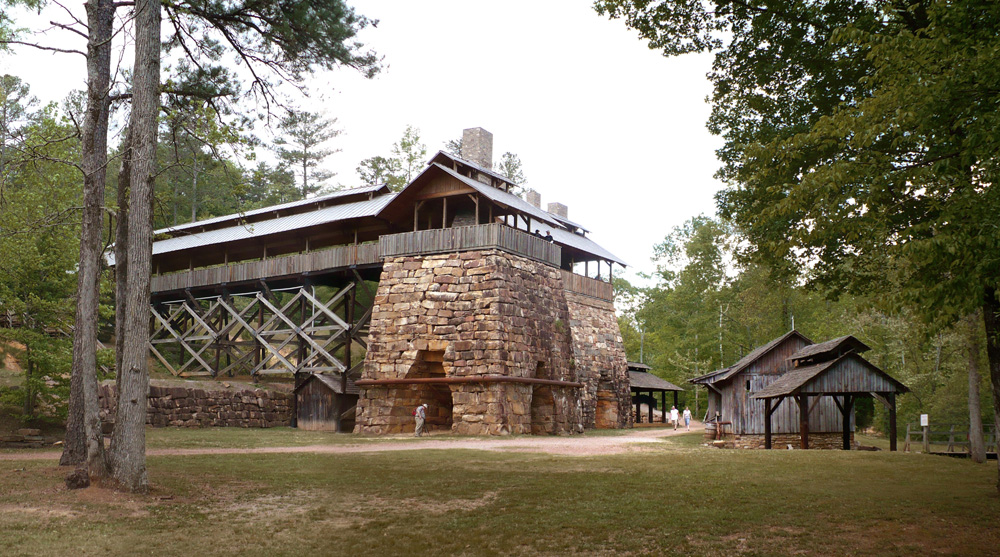
Tannehill Ironworks in Tuscaloosa County

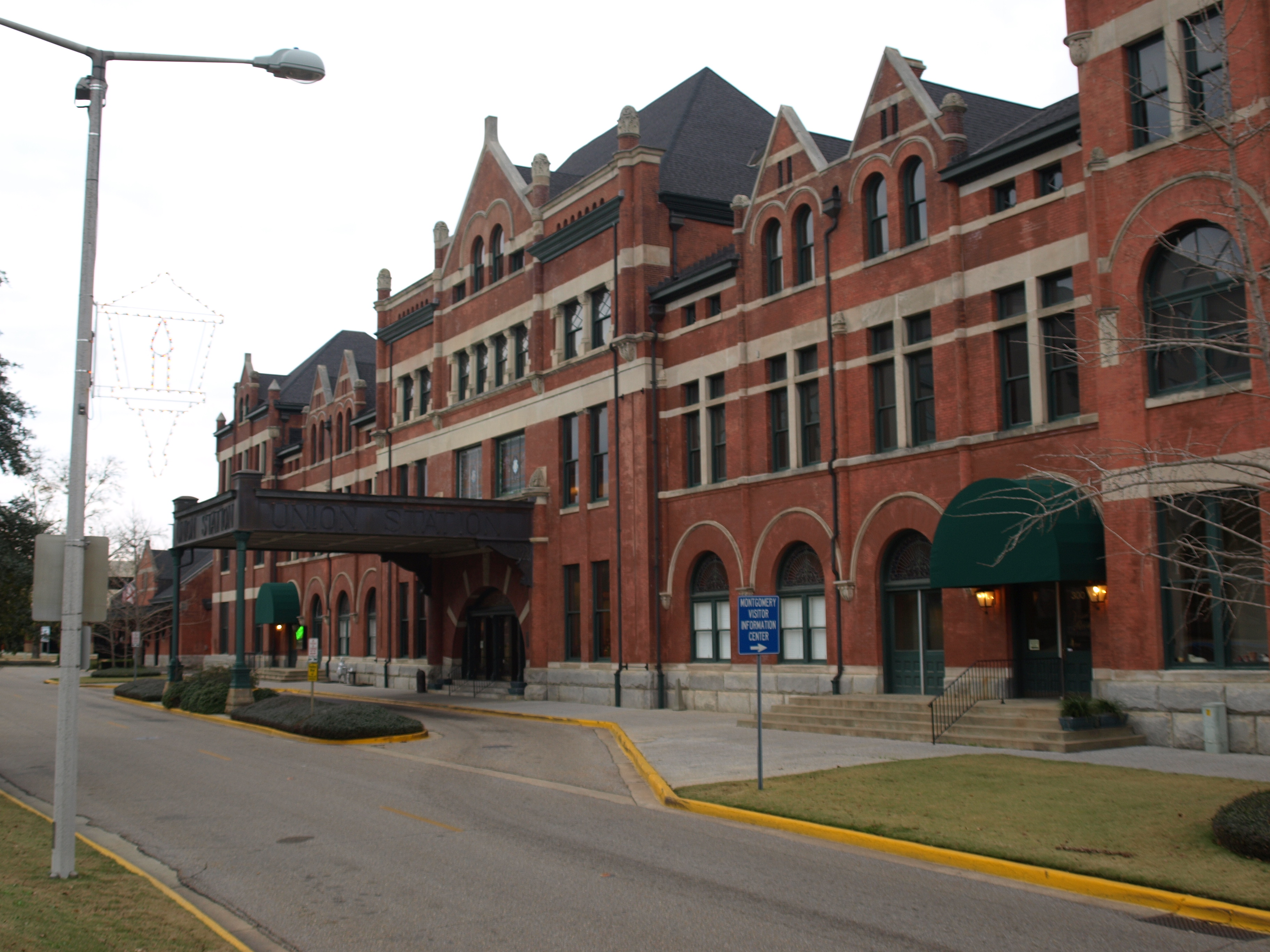
Union Station in Montgomery

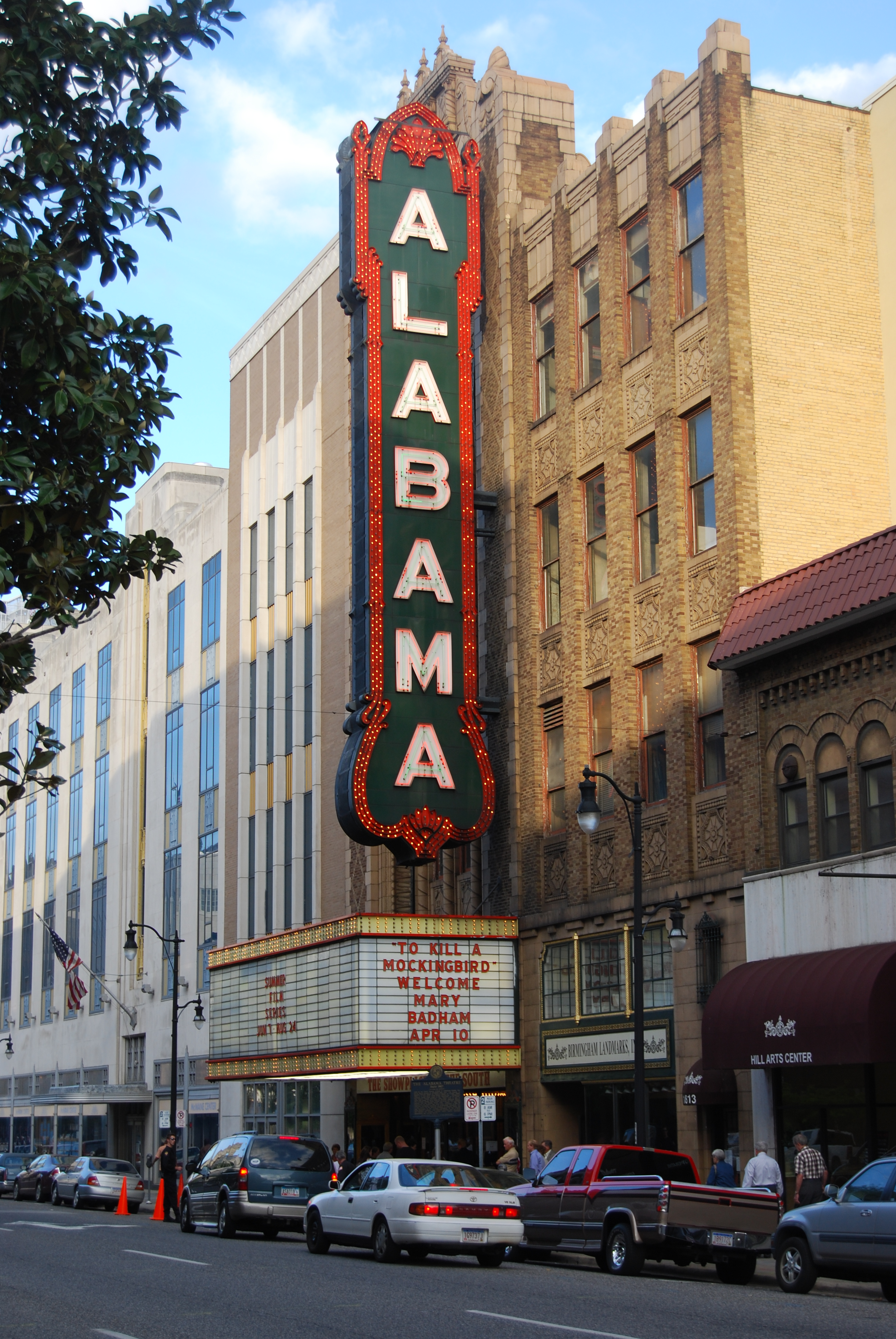
Alabama Theatre in Birmingham

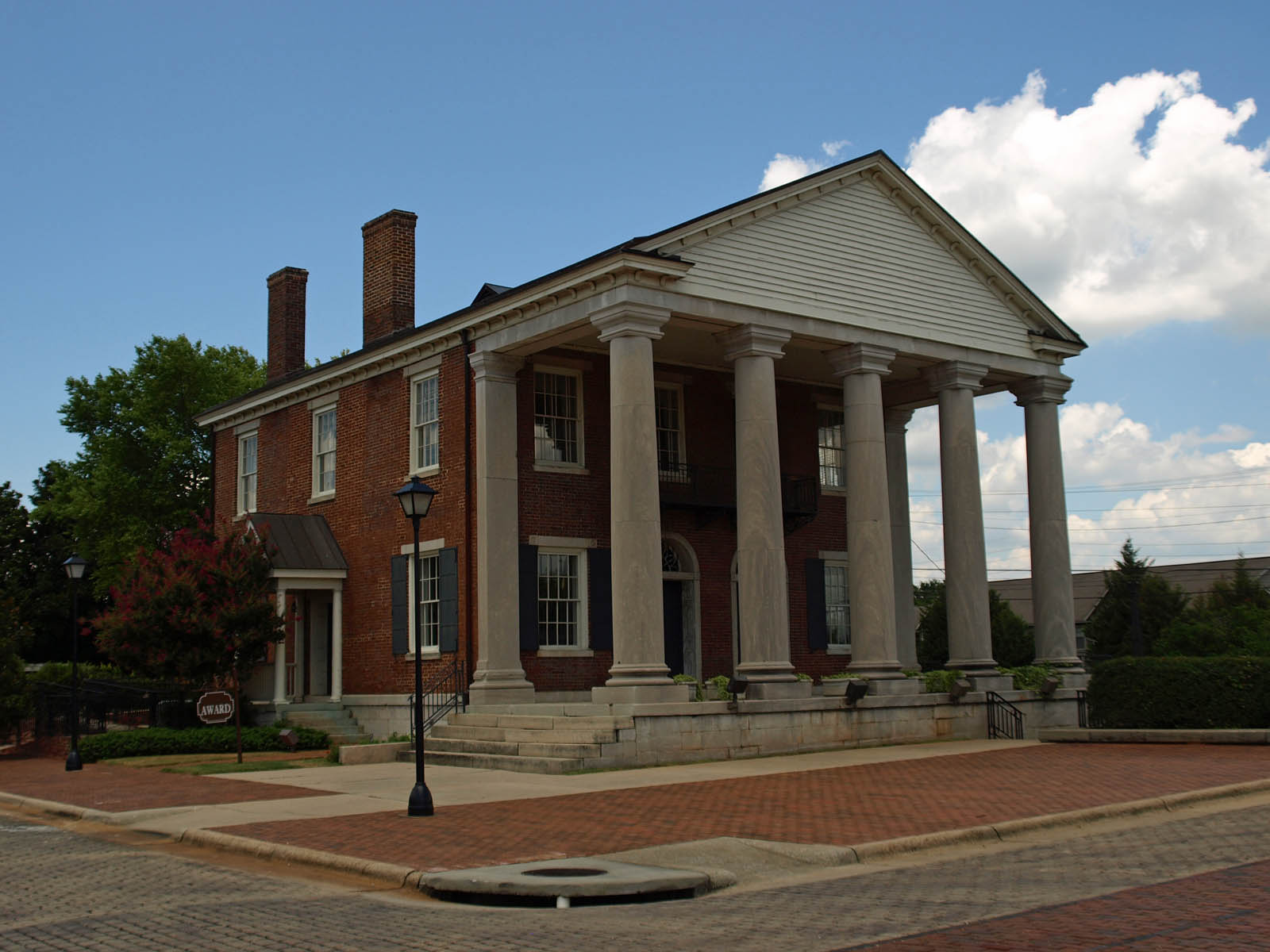
Old State Bank in Decatur

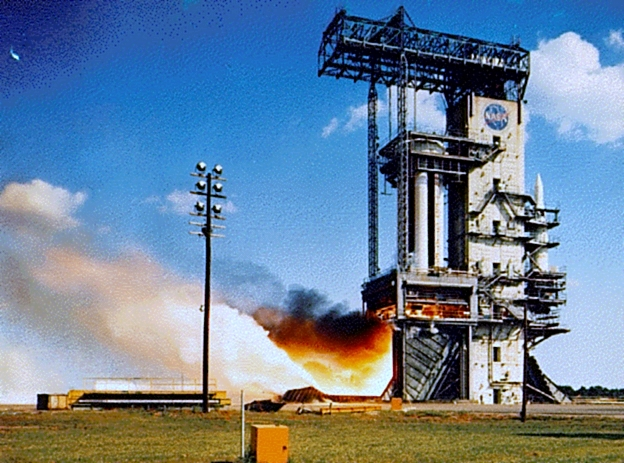
Propulsion and Structural Test Facility, Gen. George C. Marshall Space Flight Center, in Huntsville

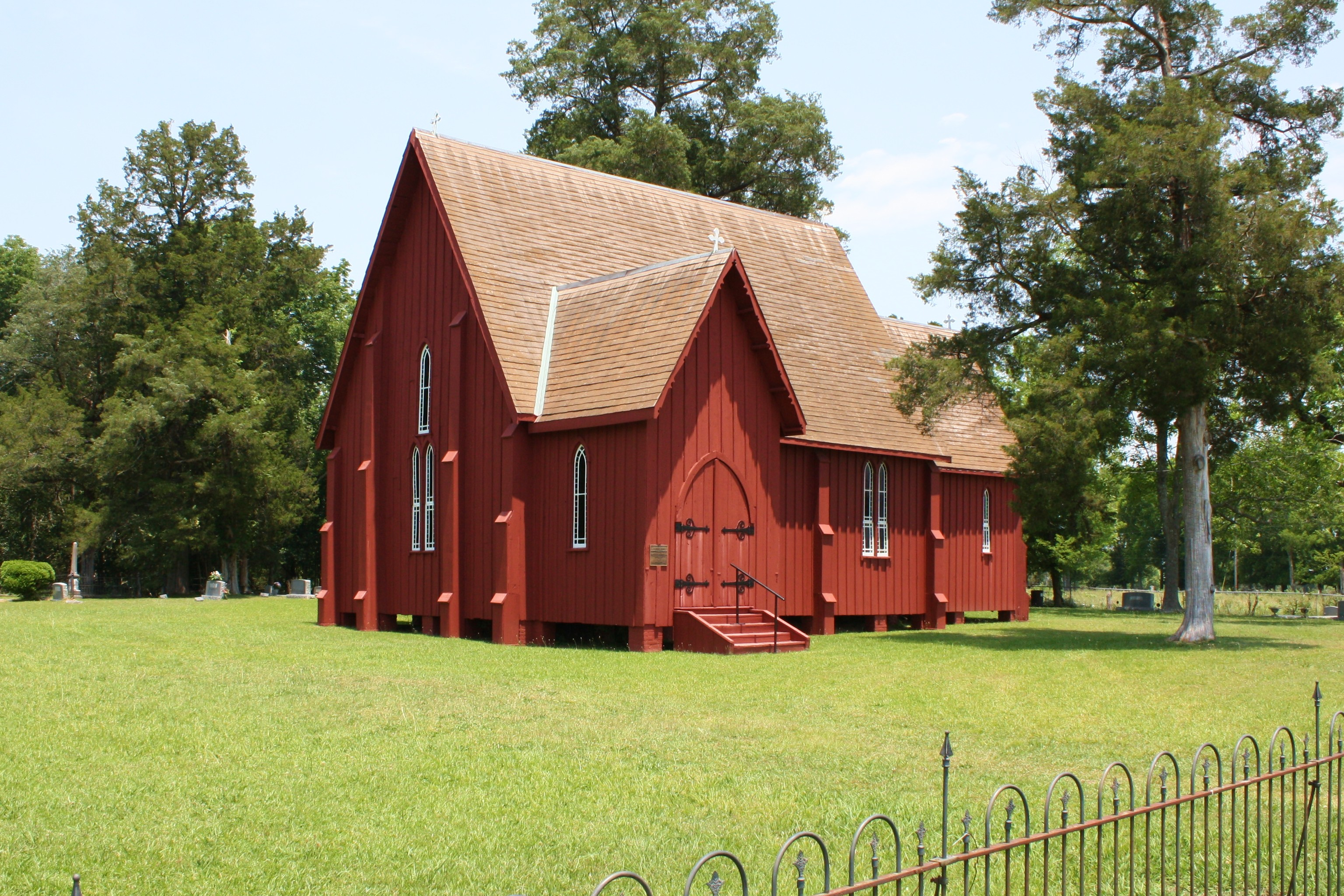
St. Andrew's Episcopal Church in Hale County

== See also ==
- List of National Historic Landmarks in Alabama
- List of Alabama state parks
- List of bridges on the National Register of Historic Places in Alabama
