= National Register of Historic Places listings in Escambia County, Alabama =

Location of Escambia County in Alabama

This is a list of the National Register of Historic Places listings in Escambia County, Alabama.

This is intended to be a complete list of the properties and districts on the National Register of Historic Places in Escambia County, Alabama, United States. Latitude and longitude coordinates are provided for many National Register properties and districts; these locations may be seen together in an online map.

There are three properties and districts listed on the National Register in the county.

This National Park Service list is complete through NPS recent listings posted January 16, 2026.

| | Name on the Register | Image | Date listed | Location | City or town | Description |
|---|---|---|---|---|---|---|
| 1 | Atmore Commercial Historic District | Atmore Commercial Historic District | June 18, 2021 (#100004641) | Carney, Main, Trammell, Roberts, Presley, E. Church & Ridgeley Sts., Pensacola, Nashville & Louisville Aves. 31°01′26″N 87°29′38″W | Atmore | |
| 2 | Brewton Historic Commercial District | Brewton Historic Commercial District | March 15, 1982 (#82002013) | U.S. Route 31 and State Route 3; 31°06′15″N 87°04′19″W | Brewton | |
| 3 | Commercial Hotel-Hart Hotel | Commercial Hotel-Hart Hotel | May 22, 1986 (#86001160) | 120 Palafox St. 31°00′00″N 87°15′34″W | Flomaton | Demolished as of October 2014 |

== See also ==
- List of National Historic Landmarks in Alabama
- National Register of Historic Places listings in Alabama
