= National Register of Historic Places listings in Geneva County, Alabama =

Location of Geneva County in Alabama

This is a list of the National Register of Historic Places listings in Geneva County, Alabama.

This is intended to be a complete list of the properties and districts on the National Register of Historic Places in Geneva County, Alabama, United States. Latitude and longitude coordinates are provided for many National Register properties and districts; these locations may be seen together in an online map.

There are two districts listed on the National Register in the county.

This National Park Service list is complete through NPS recent listings posted May 15, 2026.

	Name on the Register	Image	Date listed	Location	City or town	Description
1	Geneva Commercial Historic District	Geneva Commercial Historic District	May 13, 2026 (#100011147)	S Commerce St, E Church Ave, E Water Ave, E Town Ave; 31°02′03″N 85°51′51″W	Geneva	
2	Slocomb Commercial District		June 10, 2025 (#100011226)	Approx. 101-149 Commerce/Dalton Street. 113-180 Slocomb Street. Both sides east of Commerce/Dalton Street and the north side of Slocomb Street. 121-169 Lawrence Harris Highway on either side of Commerce/Dalton Street; 31°06′25″N 85°35′37″W	Slocomb	

== See also ==
- List of National Historic Landmarks in Alabama
- National Register of Historic Places listings in Alabama
