= National Register of Historic Places listings in Clay County, Alabama =

Location of Clay County in Alabama

This is a list of the National Register of Historic Places listings in Clay County, Alabama.

This is intended to be a complete list of the properties and districts on the National Register of Historic Places in Clay County, Alabama, United States. Latitude and longitude coordinates are provided for many National Register properties and districts; these locations may be seen together in a Google map.

There are two properties and districts listed on the National Register in the county.

This National Park Service list is complete through NPS recent listings posted April 24, 2026.

	Name on the Register	Image	Date listed	Location	City or town	Description
1	Hugo Black House	Hugo Black House	October 9, 1973 (#73000334)	S. 2nd St., E. (State Route 77); 33°15′44″N 85°50′00″W	Ashland	Photo taken in 1972 by William E. Wilson for the NPS. "[The house] was torn down many, many years ago after it had become a dilapidated structure." - Donna J. Bennett Asst. City Clerk City of Ashland
2	Clay County Courthouse	Clay County Courthouse	November 21, 1976 (#76000316)	Courthouse Sq. 33°16′27″N 85°50′09″W	Ashland	

== See also ==
- List of National Historic Landmarks in Alabama
- National Register of Historic Places listings in Alabama
