= Roanoke Downtown Historic District =

Roanoke Downtown Historic District may refer to:

- Roanoke Downtown Historic District (Alabama), listed on the NRHP in Alabama
- Roanoke Downtown Historic District (Roanoke, Virginia), listed on the NRHP in Virginia
