= National Register of Historic Places listings in Chilton County, Alabama =

Location of Chilton County in Alabama

This is a list of the National Register of Historic Places listings in Chilton County, Alabama.

This is intended to be a complete list of the properties and districts on the National Register of Historic Places in Chilton County, Alabama, United States. Latitude and longitude coordinates are provided for many National Register properties and districts; these locations may be seen together in a Google map.

There are three properties and districts listed on the National Register in the county.

This National Park Service list is complete through NPS recent listings posted January 2, 2026.

	Name on the Register	Image	Date listed	Location	City or town	Description
1	Gragg Field Historic District	Gragg Field Historic District	June 2, 2004 (#04000557)	700 Airport Rd. 32°50′57″N 86°36′35″W	Clanton	Constructed in 1937 as part of the New Deal's Works Progress Administration. In 1948, the airport acquired a hangar once used to house the planes of the famous "Tuskegee Airmen" of the United States Army Air Corps in World War II.
2	Verbena	Verbena	January 19, 1976 (#76002238)	U.S. Route 31; 32°45′13″N 86°30′38″W	Verbena	Used by Montgomery socialites in the 1870s (including poet, Sidney Lanier, of Baltimore) as a summer safe haven from outbreaks of yellow fever. They brought with them the money required to build the elaborate homes still present today in the town of Verbena.
3	Walker-Klinner Farm	Walker-Klinner Farm	October 15, 1987 (#87001849)	3.5 miles east of Maplesville on State Route 22; 32°48′09″N 86°48′25″W	Maplesville	Built by the Walker family in 1890, this two-story Eastlake-style home is at the center of a historic 1,600-acre (650 ha) farm that was established during the 1850s. The property is currently owned by the Klinner family.

== See also ==
- List of National Historic Landmarks in Alabama
- National Register of Historic Places listings in Alabama
