= National Register of Historic Places listings in Winston County, Alabama =

Location of Winston County in Alabama

This is a list of the National Register of Historic Places listings in Winston County, Alabama.

This is intended to be a complete list of the properties and districts on the National Register of Historic Places in Winston County, Alabama, United States. Latitude and longitude coordinates are provided for many National Register properties and districts; these locations may be seen together in a Google map.

There are four properties and districts listed on the National Register in the county.

This National Park Service list is complete through NPS recent listings posted October 23, 2026.

	Name on the Register	Image	Date listed	Location	City or town	Description
1	Archeological Site No. 1WI50	Archeological Site No. 1WI50	December 14, 1985 (#85003119)	Address Restricted	Haleyville	
2	Feldman's Department Store		August 12, 2009 (#09000607)	800 20th St. 34°13′35″N 87°37′30″W	Haleyville	
3	Houston Jail		June 5, 1975 (#75000331)	Off U.S. Route 278 on State Route 63; 34°08′28″N 87°15′27″W	Houston	
4	Winston County Courthouse	Winston County Courthouse	August 27, 1987 (#87001416)	Addison Rd. 34°08′48″N 87°24′08″W	Double Springs	

== See also ==
- List of National Historic Landmarks in Alabama
- National Register of Historic Places listings in Alabama
