= Yuchi Town Site =

Archaeological site in Alabama, United States

- U.S. National Register of Historic Places
- U.S. National Historic Landmark
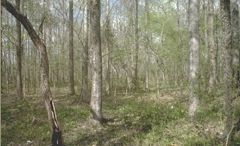
- The site today.

- Location within Alabama Location within the United States
- Location: Fort Benning; Russell County, Alabama; United States
- Built: 1650
- NRHP reference No.: 95000453

Significant dates
- Added to NRHP: June 19, 1996
- Designated NHL: June 19, 1996

Yuchi Town Site, or Yuchi Town, is a late prehistoric and historic era archaeological site showing occupation of both the Apalachicola and of Yuchi tribes. The site is located in a remote area of Fort Benning, Russell County, Alabama. The Yuchi Town Site is an example of historic Native American cultures adopting various strategies to maintain their cultural integrity in the face of European colonization and the expansion of the United States. It was declared a National Historic Landmark in 1996.

== History ==
The site was initially an Apalachicola village, indicated by graves, aboriginal pottery, trade beads, and other items. This phase of occupation is believed to date from 1650-1715, a time when Spanish influence in the region was present. At this time the Spanish established a short-lived mission at the village of Sabacola and maintained a garrison of troops at the town of Apalachicola. The Apalachicola allied with the Spanish in Florida during the 17th century against the English in the Carolinas and were ultimately destroyed as a culture.

The next phase of occupation was by the Yuchi and would continue until their removal to Indian Territory in 1836. The Yuchi constantly shifted their alliances with various European powers. They had occupied the Savannah River valley until they were defeated by the Cherokee in 1681, then the Ocmulgee River valley until 1716. After this they occupied the area surrounding the Chattahoochee River and this is when they founded Yuchi Town. It is the largest known historic village site associated with the Yuchi. They were ultimately displaced by the expanding frontier of the United States.

== See also ==
- List of National Historic Landmarks in Alabama
