= Ernest McCarty Oliver House =

- U.S. National Register of Historic Places
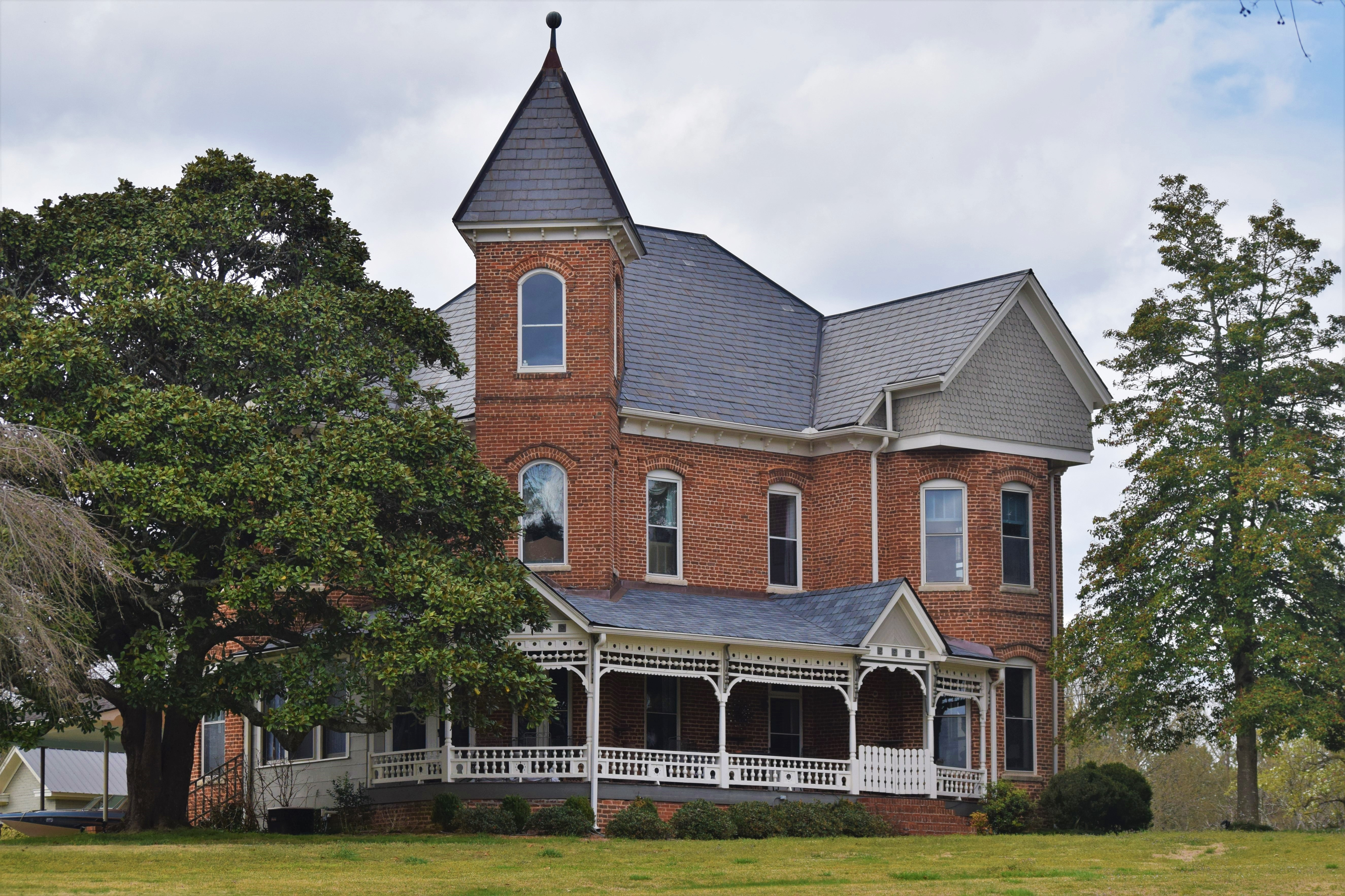
- The Ernest McCarty Oliver House in 2021

- Location within Alabama
- Location: LaFayette St. N. (U.S. 431 / S.R. 1), LaFayette, Alabama
- Coordinates: 32.906580°N 85.402389°W
- Area: 9.2 acres (3.7 ha)
- Built: 1895
- Architectural style: Late Victorian
- NRHP reference No.: 74000402
- Added to NRHP: January 21, 1974

The Ernest McCarty Oliver House, in LaFayette, Alabama, United States, is a Victorian house built in 1895. It was listed on the National Register of Historic Places in 1974.

It is a two-story brick house, primarily Victorian in style but influenced by several styles including Eastlake. It was built from brick derived from clay behind the house and baked in a kiln on site.

It is located on LaFayette Street North (U.S. Route 431 / Alabama State Route 1) in LaFayette.
