= Seven Mile Island Archeological District =

Archaeological site in Alabama, United States

- U.S. National Register of Historic Places
- U.S. Historic district
- Location within Alabama Location within the United States
- Nearest city: Sheffield, Alabama
- Coordinates: 34°45′2″N 87°44′12″W
- Area: 800 acres (320 ha)
- NRHP reference No.: 79003352
- Added to NRHP: April 16, 1979

The Seven Mile Island Archeological District is an archeological site on an island in the Tennessee River in Colbert and Lauderdale County, Alabama, United States. The island is believed to have been inhabited for about 9,000 years, with the earliest artifacts dated to the early Archaic Period. Out of 18 sites identified on the island, two have had extensive study. The Perry Site (1Lu25) is a seven-foot (2.1-meter) thick midden containing ceramic potsherds from the Archaic period. The Seven Mile Island site (1Lu21) is a Mississippian village site and mound. A number of arrowheads and flint knives, as well as a bottle with an engraved bird have been found at the site. 41 burials from the Mississippian era were also unearthed.

The district was listed on the National Register of Historic Places in 1979.
