= William T. Shepard House =

- U.S. National Register of Historic Places
- The house in 1972
- Interactive map of William T. Shepard House
- Location: Poley Rd., Opp, Alabama
- Built: 1908
- NRHP reference No.: 73000339
- Added to NRHP: August 14, 1973

The William T. Shepard House was a historic residence near Opp, Alabama, United States. The house was listed on the National Register of Historic Places in 1973.

== History ==
The house was built in a sawmill community named Poley, by William T. Shepard, a Pensacola businessman who had come to manage the sawmill in 1887. The community contained 1,000–1,500 people, and was centered around the Miller–Brent Lumber Company. Shepard moved to Montgomery in 1903 for other business, but returned to Poley in 1906. Around 1908, he built a large and elaborate house, which became the social center of the area. The mill began to decline in the 1920s due to lack of timber, and the mill was deconstructed and sold. The house was occupied by the Shepard family until 1972, when it was acquired by the Opp Historical Society. It was destroyed by fire in 1976.

== Architecture ==
The house was a two-story structure, said to be built from the "finest grade lumber available." It was constructed in a U shape around a large dogwood tree. The façade has a central gable on the second floor, with three double casement windows. A one-story porch supported by wooden columns stretched across the front of the house. The main entrance was a double door with a 12-light transom, flanked by French windows with similar transoms. The first floor contained a 31-by-20 foot (9.4 by 6 m) ballroom, with a second-floor balcony overlooking the room. A left wing had two bedrooms and a bath, while a right wing contained a dining room, kitchen, breakfast room, pantry, and covered well. The second story had three bedrooms, a bath, and a playroom.
