= Parks E. Ball House =

Historic house in Alabama, United States

- U.S. National Register of Historic Places
- Alabama Register of Landmarks and Heritage
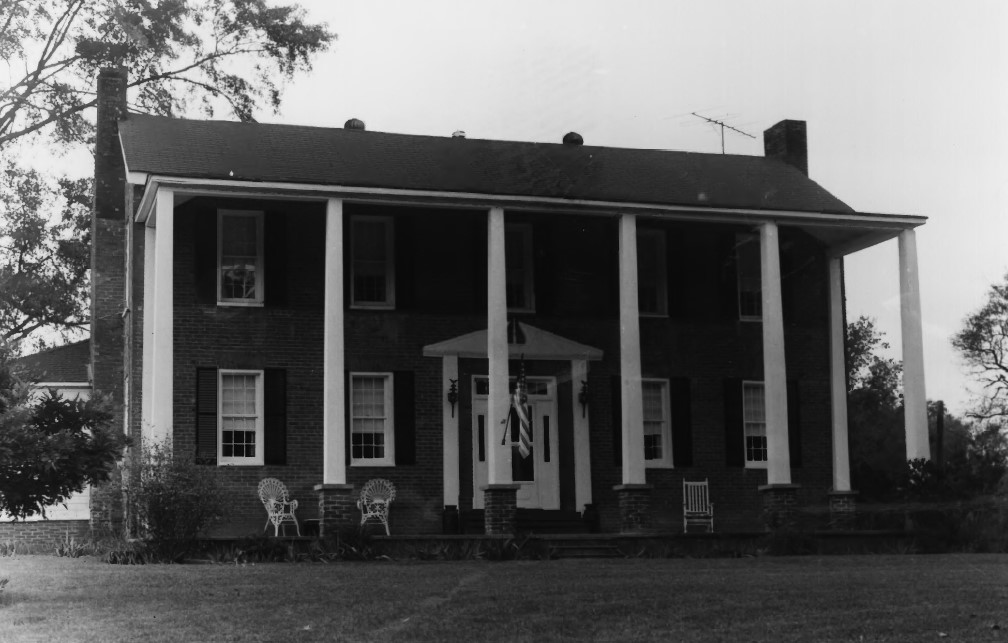
- Parks E. Ball House in 1977

- Location within Alabama Location within the United States
- Nearest city: Aliceville, Alabama
- Coordinates: 33°9′21″N 88°11′42″W
- Area: 15.5 acres (6.3 ha)
- Built: c. 1828
- Architectural style: Federal
- NRHP reference No.: 82002069

Significant dates
- Added to NRHP: January 18, 1982
- Designated ARLH: October 19, 1979

The Parks E. Ball House is a historic house near Aliceville, Alabama. It is the only surviving Antebellum brick house in the county.

It was added to the National Register of Historic Places on January 18, 1982; and added to the Alabama Register of Landmarks and Heritage list on October 19, 1979.

== Description and history ==
The rectangular, two-story Federal-style I-house was built for Parks E. Ball in about 1830. Ball was born around 1803 in the Columbia, South Carolina area. He emigrated to Alabama as a young man and purchased this property in 1826. Inside, the house follows the typical center-hall plan, with a single room to each side of the 12-foot wide passage on the first and second floors.
