= Stewart–Blanton House =

Historic house in Alabama, United States

- U.S. National Register of Historic Places
- Location within Alabama Location within the United States
- Location: AL 86, Carrollton, Alabama
- Coordinates: 33°15′24″N 88°9′28″W
- Area: less than one acre
- Architectural style: Greek Revival
- NRHP reference No.: 85001130
- Added to NRHP: May 23, 1985

The Stewart–Blanton House was a historic house on State Route 86 near Carrollton, Alabama. The two-story Greek Revival-style house was built between 1840 and 1850 for Charles Stewart, an early religious and political leader in the county. The house was five bays wide, with a two-story tetrastyle portico over the center bay. It was added to the National Register of Historic Places on May 23, 1985.
