= Wadley station =

- Wadley Railroad Depot
- U.S. National Register of Historic Places
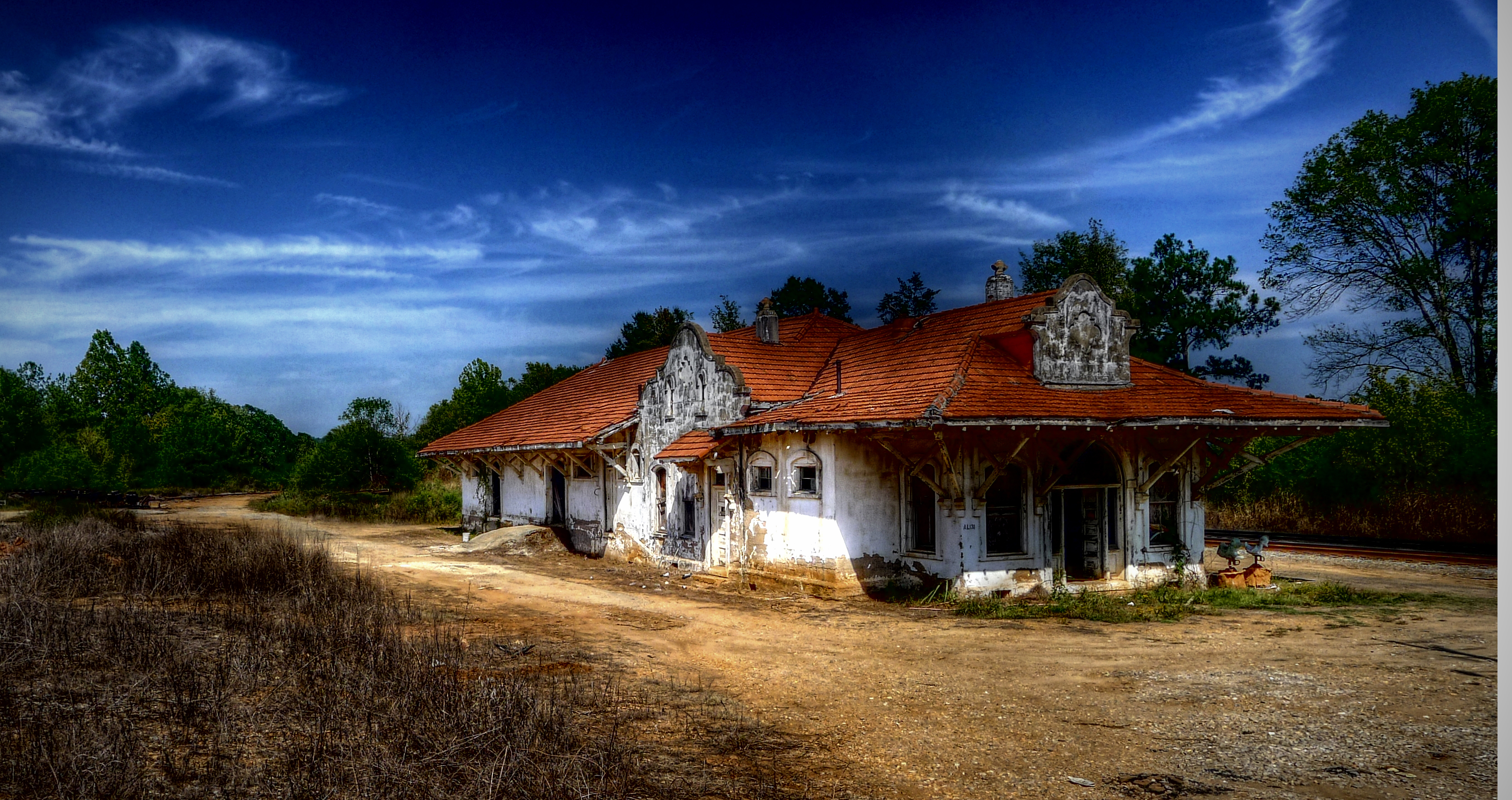
- The station in October 2011

- Location within Alabama Location within the United States
- Location: Broad St. at NE. corner of Tallapoosa St., Wadley, Alabama
- Coordinates: 33°7′18″N 85°33′46″W
- NRHP reference No.: 11000428
- Added to NRHP: July 14, 2011

The Wadley Railroad Depot is a historic train station in Wadley, Alabama. The depot was built in 1907 along with the Atlanta, Birmingham, and Atlantic Railroad line as part of an expansion from West Point, Georgia, to Talladega, Alabama. The Callaway Corporation, who operated numerous textile mills along the Chattahoochee River and later founded Callaway Gardens, purchased the land that would later become the town of Wadley, intending to build a mill in the town. The deal fell through before the mill was built, but the town continued as a local agricultural trading hub. The station closed to passenger traffic in 1964, and the line eventually came under the control of CSX Transportation.

The depot is one of only four surviving Mission Revival train stations in Alabama (the others being the Gulf, Mobile and Ohio Passenger Terminal in Mobile; the Louisville and Nashville Railroad Depot in Cullman; and the Nashville, Chattanooga, and St. Louis Railroad Depot in the Bridgeport Historic District in Bridgeport). The one-story depot has a clay tile hipped roof, with partially exposed rafter ends and large, bracketed overhangs. The south façade has an arched central opening with a double-leaf door flanked by leaded glass sidelights and topped with an arched transom. The east, track-facing, elevation has a Spanish-style frontone, to the north of which is a raised platform with two sliding wood cargo doors and two passenger door openings. The interior is divided into a passenger lobby and offices at the south end, with a waiting room and ticket office in the center, and a large cargo room at the north.

The depot was named to the Alabama Historical Commission's Places in Peril list in 2009, which led to a community effort to preserve the building. It was listed on the National Register of Historic Places in 2011.
