= Brantley Historic District =

Historic district in Alabama, United States

- U.S. National Register of Historic Places
- U.S. Historic district
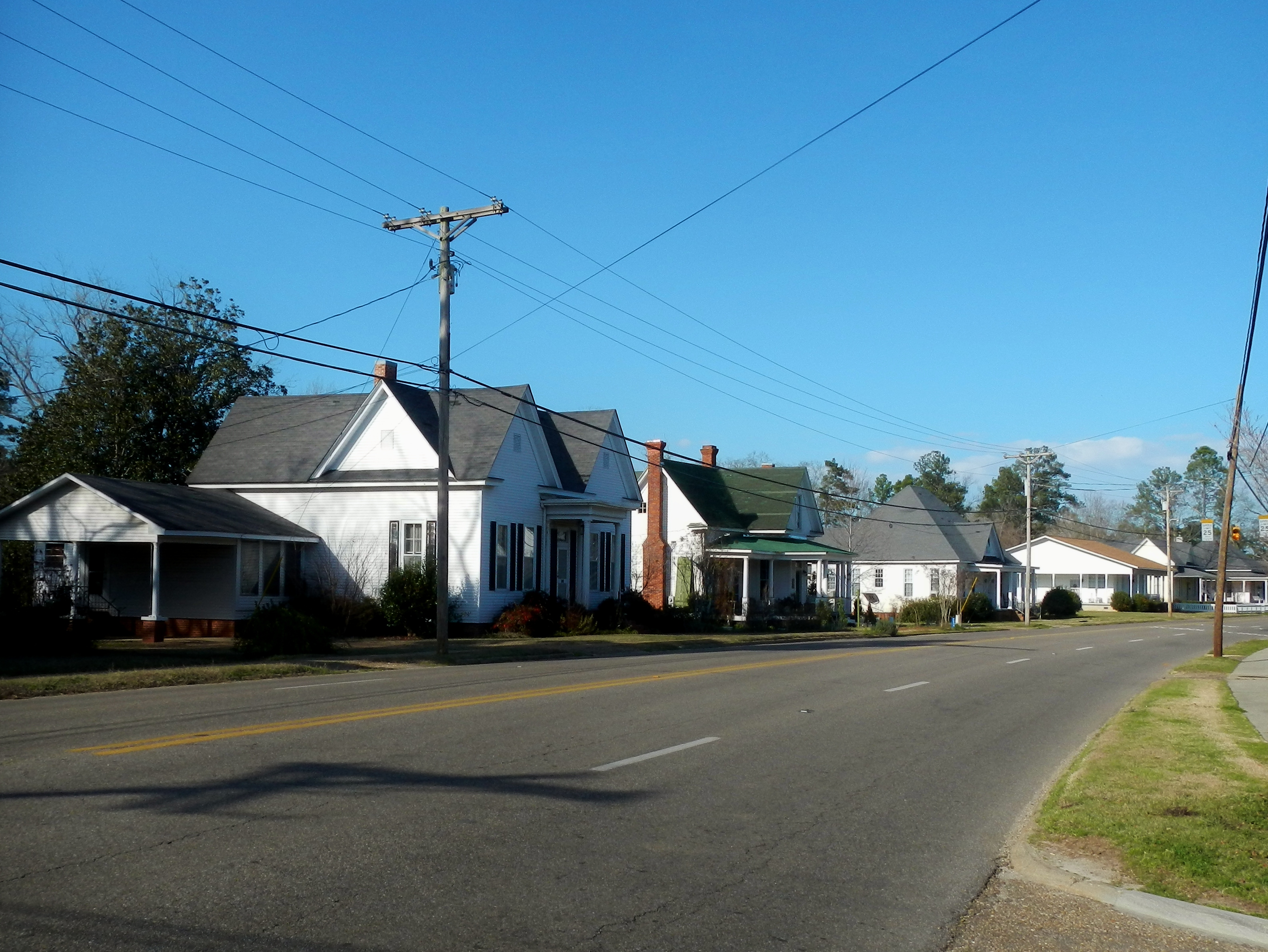

- Location within Alabama Location within the United States
- Location: Roughly bounded by Sasser St, Fulton Ave., Peachtree St. and Wyatt, and the former Central of Georgia railroad line, Brantley, Alabama
- Coordinates: 31.5824°N 86.2572°W
- Area: 48.8 acres (19.7 ha)
- Built by: Harrington, Bill; Wyatt, Buster
- Architectural style: Queen Anne, Bungalow/craftsman
- NRHP reference No.: 04000558
- Added to NRHP: June 2, 2004

The Brantley Historic District in Brantley in Crenshaw County, Alabama, United States, is a 48.8 acres (19.7 ha) historic district which was listed on the National Register of Historic Places in 2004. It then included 112 contributing buildings and 15 non-contributing ones.

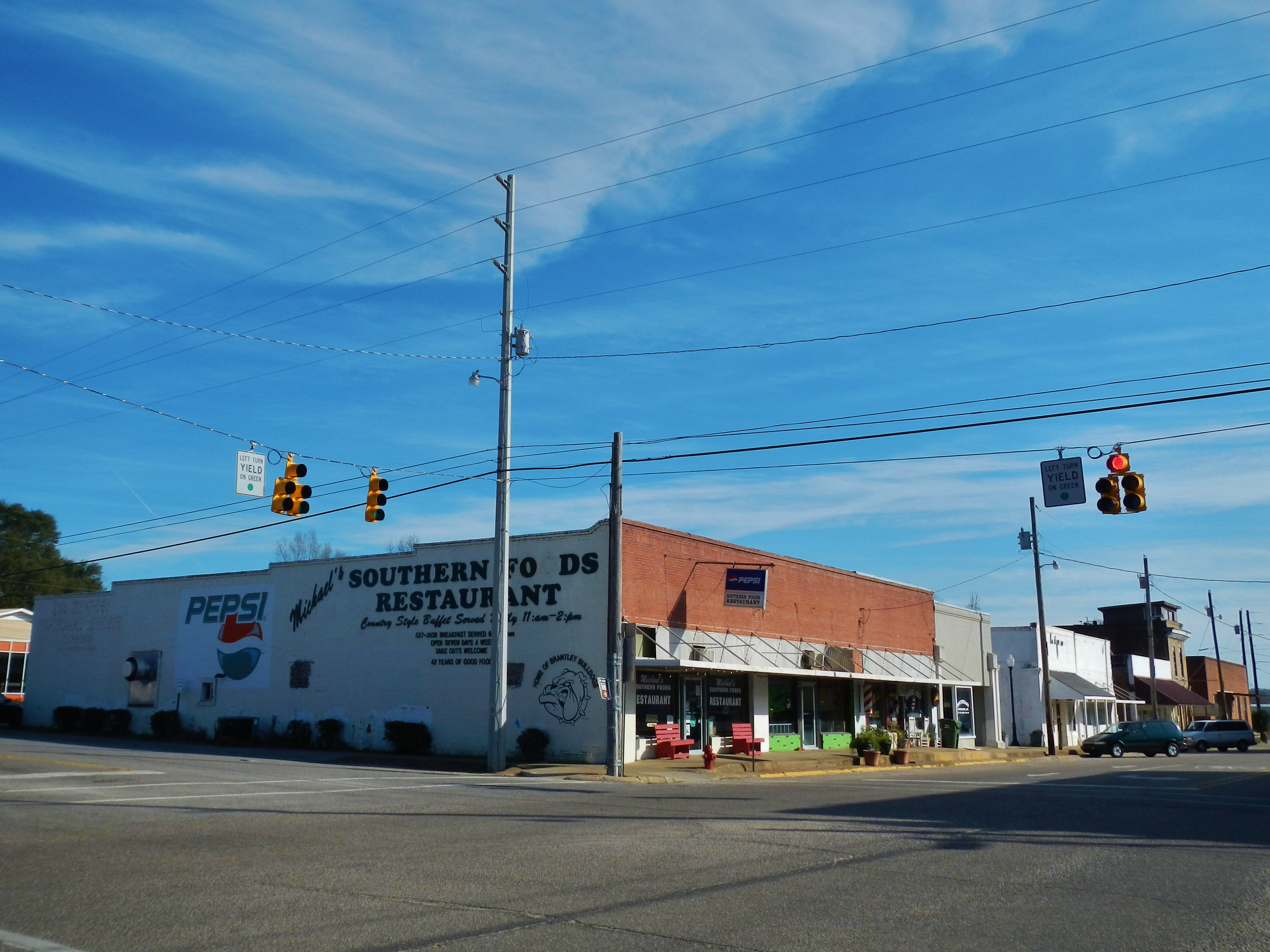
Commerce in Brantley

The district is roughly bounded by Sasser St., Fulton Ave., Peachtree St. and Wyatt, and the former Central of Georgia railroad line.

The town came into being in 1890 with the surveying of the railroad line.

The district includes commercial buildings, and it also includes residences, including Victorian cottages built along both sides of Main Street by carpenters Buster Wyatt and Bill Harrington.
