= John Morgan House =

Historic house in Alabama, United States

- U.S. National Register of Historic Places
- Alabama Register of Landmarks and Heritage
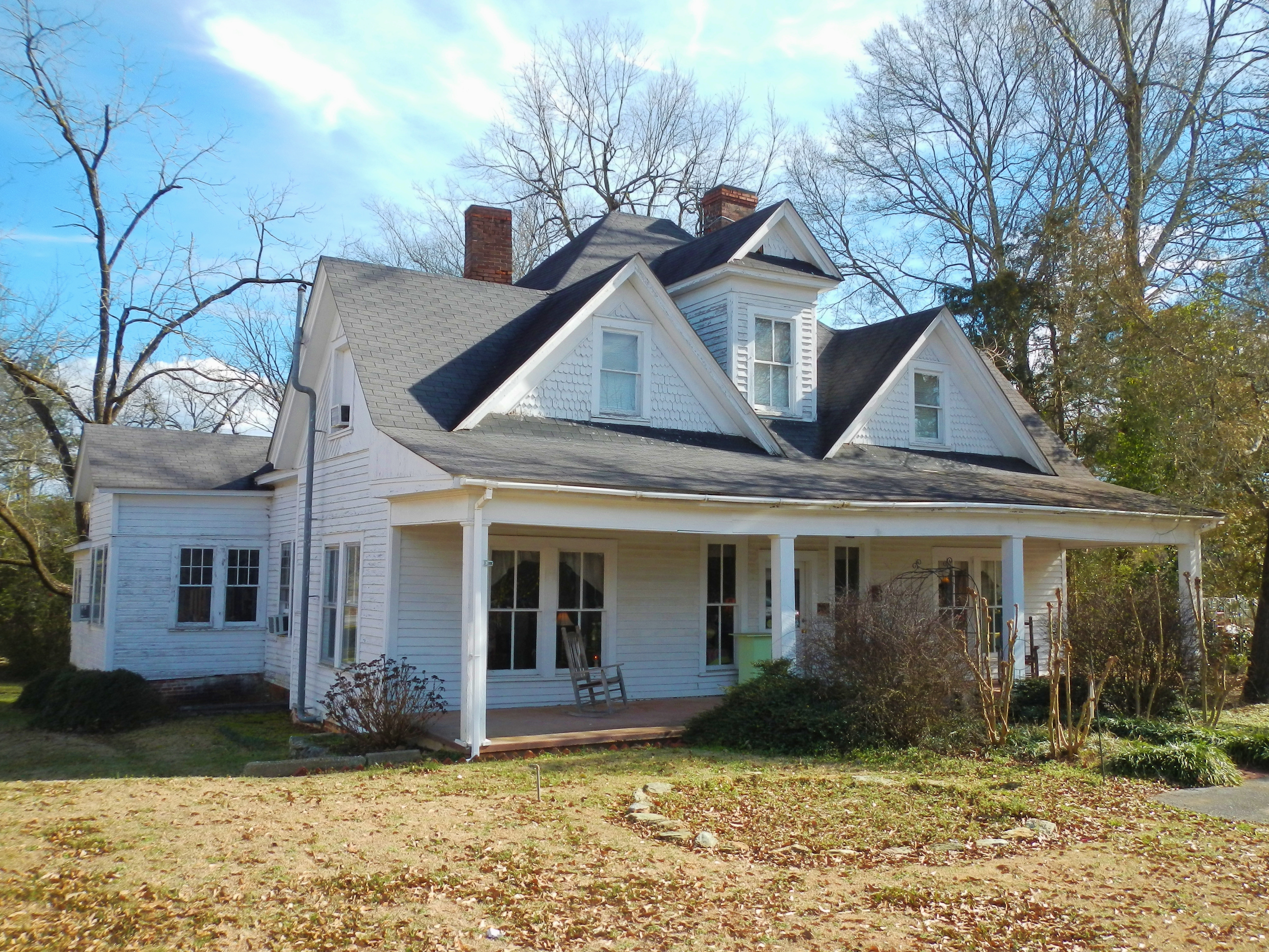
- The John Morgan House in January 2012

- Location within Alabama Location within the United States
- Location: 321 Ross Street, Heflin, Alabama
- Coordinates: 33°38′49.6″N 85°35′11″W
- Area: less than one acre
- Built: 1880
- Architectural style: Late 19th And 20th Century Revivals
- NRHP reference No.: 93000762

Significant dates
- Added to NRHP: August 5, 1993
- Designated ARLH: December 19, 1991

The John Morgan House (also known as The Colonial Cottage) is a historic house in Heflin, Alabama, United States. The house was built circa 1880 by John Francis and Louise Perryman Morgan, on land given to John for his service in the Mexican–American War. After Heflin was incorporated in 1892, Morgan was elected its first mayor.

The house originally featured two rooms and a central hall. It was expanded around 1900, adding 13 rooms, a second floor, and a wraparound porch. The upper floor features twin gable-fronted dormers and gives the house its Victorian Cottage appearance. The sides of the porch were removed and a 16th room was added on the second story in 1933.

It was listed on the Alabama Register of Landmarks and Heritage in 1991 and the National Register of Historic Places in 1993.
