= Roanoke Downtown Historic District (Alabama) =

Historic district in Alabama, United States

- U.S. National Register of Historic Places
- U.S. Historic district
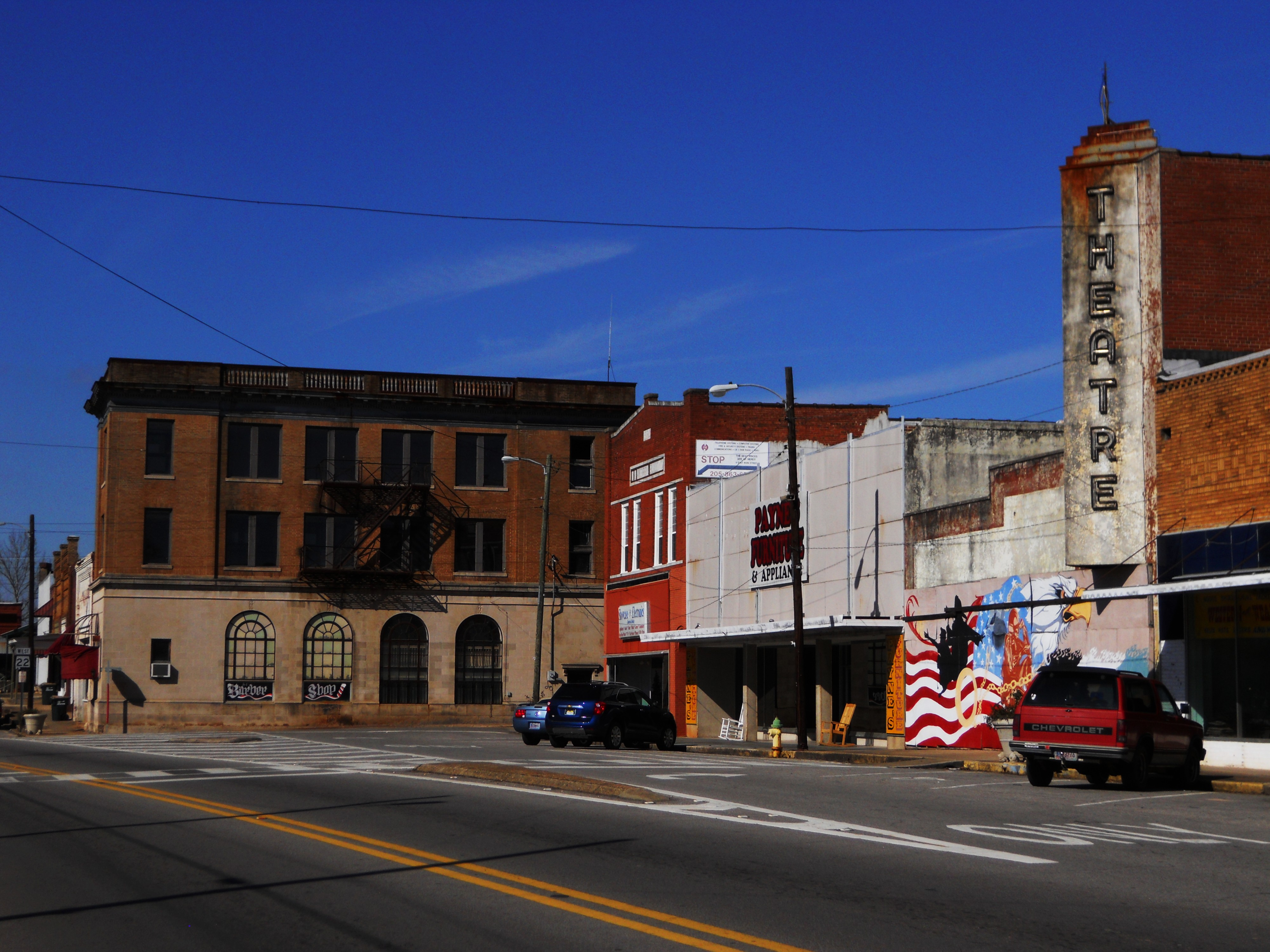
- Buildings on Main Street in January 2010

- Location within Alabama Location within the United States
- Location: Roughly bounded by White, Main, West Point, La Monte, Chestnut & Louina Sts., Roanoke, Alabama
- Coordinates: 33°9′8″N 85°22′31″W
- Area: 18 acres (7.3 ha)
- Built: 1890
- NRHP reference No.: 85003683
- Added to NRHP: February 3, 1993

The Roanoke Downtown Historic District is a historic district in Roanoke, Alabama. Roanoke was settled in the 1830s, but became a major agricultural trading center in East Alabama following the Civil War. The Central of Georgia Railway extended its line to the town in 1887, soon followed by the Atlanta, Birmingham and Atlantic Railway, and a large cotton warehouse was founded the same year. The commercial district began growing from this time, mostly with one-story brick structures, some of which carry influences from Romanesque Revival, Italianate, and Beaux-Arts details. The W. A. Handley Company built a textile mill in Roanoke in 1901, which would remain the major employer in the town until its closing in the early 1980s.

The district consists of 68 contributing properties, covering about 18 acres (7 ha) around the intersection of six streets at the town's center. Although most buildings are one story, notable multi-story buildings include the two-story Bank Building, built in Beaux-Arts style around 1909 in a wedge-shaped lot in the center of the district, and the three-story First National Bank building, built in 1920 in Neoclassical style. Also notable are the Romanesque Old City Hall (1890), the Victorian Gothic First Baptist Church (1901), and the Art Moderne City Hall (1935).

The district was listed on the National Register of Historic Places in 1993.
