= List of National Historic Landmarks in Alabama =

Alabama National Historic Landmarks (clickable map)

The National Historic Landmarks in Alabama represent Alabama's history from the precolonial era, through the Civil War, the Civil Rights Movement, and the Space Age. There are 39 National Historic Landmarks (NHLs) in Alabama, which are located in 18 of the state's 67 counties. Five of the NHLs in the state have military significance, eight are significant examples of a particular architectural style, six are archaeological sites, seven played a role in the African American struggle for civil rights, and five are associated with the development of the U.S. Space Program. One site in Alabama was designated an NHL, but the designation was subsequently removed.

The National Historic Landmark program is administered by the National Park Service, an agency within the Department of the Interior. The National Park Service determines which properties meet NHL criteria and makes nomination recommendations after an owner notification process. The Secretary of the Interior reviews nominations and, based on a set of predetermined criteria, makes a decision on NHL designation or a determination of eligibility for designation. Both public and privately owned properties are designated as NHLs. This designation provides indirect, partial protection of the historic integrity of the properties via tax incentives, grants, monitoring of threats, and other means. Owners may object to the nomination of the property as an NHL. When this is the case, the Secretary of the Interior can only designate a site as eligible for designation.

NHLs are also included on the National Register of Historic Places (NRHP), historic properties that the National Park Service deem worthy of preservation. The primary difference between an NHL and a NRHP listing is that the NHLs are determined to have national significance, while other NRHP properties are deemed significant at the local or state level. The NHLs in Alabama comprise 3% of the approximately 1178 properties and districts listed on the National Register of Historic Places in Alabama.

Four historic sites in the state are managed by the National Park Service. One of these, the Tuskegee Institute National Historic Site, is also designated an NHL. The others are Horseshoe Bend National Military Park, Russell Cave National Monument, and Tuskegee Airmen National Historic Site.

== Key ==
^{†}	National Historic Landmark
^{§}	National Historic Landmark and National Historic Site
^{#}	National Register of Historic Places only

== National Historic Landmarks ==
	Landmark name	Image	Date designated	Location	County	Description
1^{†}	USS Alabama (battleship)	USS Alabama (battleship)	January 14, 1986 (#86000083)	Mobile; 30°40′49″N 88°00′57″W	Mobile	One of two surviving South Dakota-class battleships, Alabama was commissioned in 1942 and spent forty months in active service in World War II's Pacific theater, earning nine battle stars over twenty-six engagements with the Japanese.
2^{†}	Apalachicola Fort	Apalachicola Fort	July 19, 1964 (#66000931)	Holy Trinity; 32°10′17″N 85°07′49″W	Russell	Spain established this wattle and daub blockhouse on the Chattahoochee River in 1690, attempting to maintain influence among the towns of the Apalachicola Province#English contacts. It was used for one year, and destroyed by the Spanish when they abandoned it.
3^{†}	Barton Hall	Barton Hall	November 7, 1973 (#73000337)	Cherokee; 34°45′03″N 88°00′12″W	Colbert	This structure, built in 1840, is described by the National Park Service as an "unusually sophisticated" Greek Revival style plantation house. The interior contains a stairway that ascends in a series of double flights and bridge-like landings to an observatory on the rooftop that offers views of the plantation.
4^{†}	Bethel Baptist Church, Parsonage, and Guard House	Bethel Baptist Church, Parsonage, and Guard House	April 5, 2005 (#05000455)	Birmingham; 33°33′07″N 86°48′07″W	Jefferson	This church served as the headquarters for the Alabama Christian Movement for Human Rights, an organization active in the Civil Rights Movement, from 1956 to 1961. It focused on legal and nonviolent direct action against segregated accommodations, transportation, schools and employment discrimination.
5^{†}	Bottle Creek Site	Bottle Creek Site	April 19, 1994 (#74000398)	Stockton; 30°59′44″N 87°56′16″W	Baldwin	This archaeological site contains eighteen mounds from the Mississippian cultural period. Located on Mound Island within the Mobile-Tensaw river delta, the site was occupied between AD 1250 and 1550. Scholars believe that it functioned as a social, political, religious, and trade center for the Mobile Delta region and the central Gulf Coast.
6^{†}	Brown Chapel A.M.E. Church	Brown Chapel A.M.E. Church	December 12, 1997 (#82002009)	Selma; 32°24′43″N 87°00′58″W	Dallas	This church was a starting point for the Selma to Montgomery marches in 1965, and it played a major role in the events that led to the adoption of the Voting Rights Act of 1965. The national reaction to Selma's "Bloody Sunday March" is widely credited with making the passage of the Voting Rights Act politically viable in the United States Congress.
7^{†}	City Hall	City Hall	November 7, 1973 (#69000034)	Mobile; 30°41′24″N 88°02′24″W	Mobile	The Italianate style Old City Hall and Southern Market in Mobile was completed in 1857. This building exemplifies the 19th-century American trend toward structures that served multiple civic functions.
8^{†}	Henry D. Clayton House	Henry D. Clayton House	December 8, 1976 (#76002259)	Clayton; 31°51′56″N 85°27′09″W	Barbour	This was the home of antitrust legislator Henry De Lamar Clayton, Jr. He was the author of the Clayton Antitrust Act, an act that prohibited particular types of conduct that were deemed to not be in the best interest of a competitive market. He was appointed as a Federal District Judge in 1914, and became recognized as an advocate for judicial reform.
9^{†}	J.L.M. Curry Home	J.L.M. Curry Home	December 21, 1965 (#66000154)	Talladega; 33°27′21″N 86°02′40″W	Talladega	This was the home of educator Jabez Lamar Monroe Curry. He played a large role in the expansion and improvement of the public school system and the establishment of training schools for teachers throughout the South.
10^{†}	Dexter Avenue Baptist Church	Dexter Avenue Baptist Church	May 30, 1974 (#74000431)	Montgomery; 32°22′39″N 86°18′11″W	Montgomery	Martin Luther King Jr. was the pastor of this church from 1954 to 1960. The Montgomery Improvement Association, which was headed by Dr. King, had its headquarters in the church and organized the Montgomery bus boycott from this site in 1955.
11^{†}	USS Drum (submarine)	USS Drum (submarine)	January 14, 1986 (#86000086)	Mobile; 30°40′44″N 88°01′00″W	Mobile	Launched on May 12, 1941, this was the first of the Gato-class submarines completed before World War II. It represents what was the standard design for American fleet submarines at the beginning of that war. The USS Drum sank fifteen Japanese ships and earned twelve battle stars.
12^{†}	Episcopal Church of the Nativity	Episcopal Church of the Nativity	June 21, 1990 (#74000420)	Huntsville; 34°43′49″N 86°35′03″W	Madison	This Gothic Revival church was built in 1859, and is considered by the National Park Service as one of the most pristine examples of Ecclesiastical Gothic architecture in the South. It is also one of the least-altered structures designed by architect Frank Wills.
13^{†}	First Confederate Capitol	First Confederate Capitol	December 19, 1960 (#66000152)	Montgomery; 32°22′33″N 86°18′03″W	Montgomery	Delegates from six seceding Southern states met here on February 4, 1861. On February 8, they adopted a "Constitution for the Provisional Government of the Confederate States of America." Jefferson Davis was inaugurated on the west portico on February 18. The Congress of the Confederate States met here until May 22, 1861, when the capital moved to Richmond, Virginia.
14^{†}	Fort Mitchell Site	Fort Mitchell Site	June 21, 1990 (#72000178)	Fort Mitchell; 32°21′07″N 85°01′18″W	Russell	Fort Mitchell represents three periods of interaction with Native Americans. The first period is the martial aspect of Manifest Destiny, when the Creek Indian Nation was defeated and forced to concede land.; the second represents the Indian Factory; the last concerns U.S. government attempts to honor treaty obligations.
15^{†}	Fort Morgan	Fort Morgan	December 19, 1960 (#66000146)	Gasque; 30°13′41″N 88°01′23″W	Baldwin	Fort Morgan was completed in 1834 and was used by Confederate forces during the Battle of Mobile Bay. This battle resulted in the Union Navy's Admiral David Farragut taking Mobile Bay and sealing off the Port of Mobile to Confederate shipping.
16^{†}	Fort Toulouse Site-Fort Jackson	Fort Toulouse Site-Fort Jackson	October 9, 1960 (#66000148)	Wetumpka; 32°30′24″N 86°15′06″W	Elmore	Fort Toulouse served as the easternmost outpost of colonial French Louisiana. It was established in 1717 at the confluence of the Coosa and Tallapoosa rivers, and was abandoned in 1763, after the Treaty of Paris. Andrew Jackson reestablished a fort here in 1814 following his defeat of the Creek Nation at the Battle of Horseshoe Bend.
17^{†}	Foster Auditorium	Foster Auditorium	April 5, 2005 (#05000457)	Tuscaloosa; 33°12′28″N 87°32′38″W	Tuscaloosa	The Alabama National Guard, Federal marshals, and U.S. Attorney General Nicholas Katzenbach escorted Vivian Malone past Alabama governor George C. Wallace during his infamous "Stand In The Schoolhouse Door" in front of this building in 1963. This was the first step in desegregating the University of Alabama and is seen as an important event in the Civil Rights Movement.
18^{†}	Gaineswood	Gaineswood	November 7, 1973 (#72000167)	Demopolis; 32°30′31″N 87°50′07″W	Marengo	This Greek Revival mansion was designated an NHL because it is considered one of the most unusual examples of that architectural style in the United States. It was built over the course of eighteen years by amateur architect and planter Nathan Bryan Whitfield. It is one of the few Greek Revival homes that features the Doric, Ionic, and Corinthian orders of architecture.
19^{†}	Government Street Presbyterian Church	Government Street Presbyterian Church	October 5, 1992 (#92001885)	Mobile; 30°41′21″N 88°02′39″W	Mobile	This church was built in 1836 and is one of the oldest and least-altered Greek Revival church buildings in the United States. The architectural design is by James Gallier, James Dakin, and Charles Dakin.
20^{†}	Ivy Green	Ivy Green	March 31, 1992 (#70000101)	Tuscumbia; 34°44′22″N 87°42′24″W	Colbert	This site is where deaf and blind Helen Keller was born and learned to communicate, with the aid of her teacher and constant companion, Anne Sullivan.
21^{†}	Kenworthy Hall	Kenworthy Hall	August 18, 2004 (#90001318)	Marion; 32°38′06″N 87°21′07″W	Perry	This plantation house was completed in 1860 and is one of the best preserved examples of Richard Upjohn's distinctive asymmetrical Italian villa style. It is the only surviving residential example of Upjohn's Italian villa style that was especially designed to suit the Southern climate and the plantation lifestyle.
22^{†}	Monroe County Courthouse	Monroe County Courthouse	January 13, 2021 (#100006236)	Courthouse Sq. 31°31′38″N 87°19′27″W	Monroe	1903 courthouse, known for its literary association with Truman Capote and Harper Lee.
23^{†}	Montgomery (snagboat)	Montgomery (snagboat)	June 30, 1989 (#83003521)	Pickensville; 33°13′26″N 88°15′36″W	Pickens	One of the few surviving steam-powered sternwheelers in the United States, it is one of two surviving United States Army Corps of Engineers snagboats. It was built in 1925 and played a major role in building the Alabama–Tombigbee–Tennessee River Project.
24^{†}	Montgomery Union Station and Trainshed	Montgomery Union Station and Trainshed	December 8, 1976 (#73000368)	Montgomery; 32°22′43″N 86°18′52″W	Montgomery	Constructed in 1898, this is an example of late 19th-century commercial architecture. It served as the focal point of transportation into Montgomery. The train shed is significant in that it shows the adaptation of bridge-building techniques to shelter structures, an important step in the history of American engineering.
25^{†}	Moundville Site	Moundville Site	July 19, 1964 (#66000149)	Moundville; 33°00′17″N 87°37′52″W	Hale	Moundville was first settled in the 10th century and represents a major period of Mississippian culture in the Southern United States. It acted as the center for a southerly diffusion of this culture toward the Gulf Coast. It was the second largest site of the classic Middle Mississippian era, after Cahokia in Illinois.
26^{†}	Neutral Buoyancy Space Simulator	Neutral Buoyancy Space Simulator	October 3, 1985 (#85002807)	Huntsville; 34°39′07″N 86°40′41″W	Madison	This structure was built in 1955 to provide a simulated zero-gravity environment in which engineers, designers, and astronauts could perform the various phases of research needed to gain firsthand knowledge concerning design and operation problems associated with working in space. It contributed significantly to the United States space program, especially Project Gemini, the Apollo program, Skylab, and the Space Shuttle.
27^{†}	Edmund Pettus Bridge	Edmund Pettus Bridge	February 27, 2013 (#13000281)	Selma; 32°24′20″N 87°01′07″W	Dallas	This bridge across the Alabama River is noted for being the site of a bloody encounter during the 1965 Selma to Montgomery marches, an event influential in the passage of that year's Voting Rights Act.
28^{†}	Propulsion and Structural Test Facility	Propulsion and Structural Test Facility	October 3, 1985 (#85002804)	Huntsville; 34°37′25″N 86°39′31″W	Madison	This site was built in 1957 by the Army Ballistic Missile Agency and was the primary center responsible for the development of large vehicles and rocket propulsion systems. The Saturn Family of launch vehicles was developed here under the direction of Wernher von Braun. The Saturn V remains the most powerful launch vehicle ever brought to operational status, from a height, weight and payload standpoint.
29^{†}	Redstone Test Stand	Redstone Test Stand	October 3, 1985 (#76000341)	Huntsville; 34°37′51″N 86°40′00″W	Madison	This steel frame structure was built in 1953 and is the oldest static firing facility at the Marshall Space Flight Center. It was important in the development of the Jupiter-C and Mercury/Redstone vehicles that launched the first U.S. satellite and the first U.S. manned spaceflight.
30^{†}	St. Andrew's Church	St. Andrew's Church	November 7, 1973 (#73000347)	Prairieville; 32°30′33″N 87°42′05″W	Hale	This small Carpenter Gothic church, with wooden buttresses, was built in 1853, and shows the influence of 19th-century architectural leader Richard Upjohn. It is considered one of the Southeast's outstanding examples of the picturesque movement in American church building.
31^{†}	Saturn V Dynamic Test Stand	Saturn V Dynamic Test Stand	October 3, 1985 (#85002806)	Huntsville; 34°37′45″N 86°39′40″W	Madison	Built in 1964 to conduct mechanical and vibrational tests on the fully assembled Saturn V rocket; major problems capable of causing failure of the vehicle were discovered and corrected here.
32^{†}	Saturn V Dynamic Test Vehicle	Saturn V Dynamic Test Vehicle	February 10, 1987 (#78000500)	Huntsville; 34°42′30″N 86°39′21″W	Madison	This was the prototype for the Saturn V launch vehicle and was the first Saturn V constructed by the Marshall Space Flight Center under the direction of Dr. Wernher von Braun. It served as the test vehicle for the Saturn support facilities at the Marshall Space Flight Center.
33^{†}	16th Street Baptist Church	16th Street Baptist Church	February 20, 2006 (#80000696)	Birmingham; 33°31′00″N 86°48′53″W	Jefferson	This church was used as a meeting place, training center, and as a departure point for marches during the Civil Rights Movement. It was the site of a bombing by the Ku Klux Klan on September 15, 1963, in which four young girls were killed and twenty-two others were injured.
34^{†}	Sloss Blast Furnaces	Sloss Blast Furnaces	May 29, 1981 (#72000162)	Birmingham; 33°31′14″N 86°47′29″W	Jefferson	Built from 1881 to 1882, this is the oldest remaining blast furnace in the state. Its NHL designation represents Alabama's early 20th-century preeminence in the production of pig iron and cast iron, an example of a post-Civil War effort to industrialize the agrarian South.
35^{†}	Swayne Hall, Talladega College	Swayne Hall, Talladega College	December 2, 1974 (#74002223)	Talladega; 33°26′01″N 86°06′48″W	Talladega	Swayne Hall was built in 1857 as a Baptist men's college. Following the American Civil War, it became a part of Talladega College, Alabama's oldest private, historically black, liberal arts college.
36^{§}	Tuskegee Institute National Historic Site	Tuskegee Institute National Historic Site	June 23, 1965 (#66000151)	Tuskegee; 32°25′49″N 85°42′28″W	Macon	One of the best known African American universities in the United States, Tuskegee was founded by Booker T. Washington in 1881. It began with a curriculum designed to provide industrial and vocational education to African Americans and featured such acclaimed educators as George Washington Carver. Tuskegee Institute is both a National Historic Landmark and a National Historic Site.
37^{†}	United States Post Office and Courthouse–Montgomery	United States Post Office and Courthouse–Montgomery	July 21, 2015 (#98000611)	Montgomery; 32°22′30″N 86°18′34″W	Montgomery	Many key civil rights cases, including the bus boycott litigation, were heard in this 1933 building.
38^{†}	Wilson Dam	Wilson Dam	November 13, 1966 (#66000147)	Florence; 34°48′03″N 87°37′33″W	Colbert and Lauderdale	Wilson Dam, on the Tennessee River, was built between 1918 and 1925 by the United States Army Corps of Engineers and later came under the control of the Tennessee Valley Authority (TVA). It is the oldest of TVA's hydroelectric dams.
39^{†}	Yuchi Town Site	Yuchi Town Site	June 19, 1996 (#95000453)	Fort Benning; 32°18′00″N 84°59′00″W	Russell	This archaeological site was occupied by people of the Apalachicola Province and Yuchi tribes. During the 17th century, towns of Apalachicola Province allied with the Spanish in Florida against the English in Carolina and were ultimately destroyed as a culture. The Yuchi tribe settled here later and constantly shifted their alliances with various European powers, until they were displaced by the expanding American frontier in the Southeast in the early 19th century.

== Former National Historic Landmark ==
	Landmark name	Image	Date designated	Date withdrawn	Locality	County	Description
38^{#}	William Lowndes Yancey Law Office		November 7, 1973	March 6, 1986	Montgomery; 32°22′30″N 86°18′26″W	Montgomery	William Lowndes Yancey, a lawyer, populist legislator, firebrand orator, and party leader, had his law office in this building from 1846 until his death in 1863. Through successive modernizations and restorations in the 1970s and 1980s, the building lost much of the historic integrity for which it was originally designated a landmark, leading to the withdrawal of its designation. It was, however, retained on the National Register of Historic Places.

== See also ==
- National Register of Historic Places listings in Alabama
- History of Alabama
- List of U.S. National Historic Landmarks by state
- List of areas in the United States National Park System
- List of National Natural Landmarks in Alabama
