= Properties on the Alabama Register of Landmarks and Heritage by county (Clarke–Dallas) =

This is a list of properties on the Alabama Register of Landmarks and Heritage, sorted alphabetically by county. This list contains all entries for Clarke County through Dallas County, the other listings may be found here. The Alabama Register of Landmarks and Heritage is an official listing of buildings, sites, structures, objects, and districts deemed worthy of preservation in the U.S. state of Alabama.

These properties, which may be of national, state, and local significance, are designated by the Alabama Historical Commission, under the authority of the Alabama Legislature. General criteria for inclusion in the Alabama Register includes that the property is at least 40 years old; is associated with events of state or local significance; is associated with the lives of persons of state or local significance; is representative of a type, style, or period of architecture; or is associated with Alabama's history or prehistory. It must also possess integrity of location and construction and convey a feeling for the time and place of construction.

The Alabama Register occasionally includes properties that do not meet the general criteria for inclusion, such as moved or reconstructed structures. These properties are included when they have been sensitively relocated to a site similar to the original, closely match the construction of the original significant building, or are of exceptional importance to the state.

There are approximately 1,711 properties and districts listed on the Alabama Register. Of these, approximately 243 are also listed on the National Register of Historic Places (NRHP) and 6 are designated as National Historic Landmarks (NHL).

Clarke – Clay – Cleburne – Coffee – Colbert – Conecuh – Coosa – Covington – Crenshaw – Cullman – Dale – Dallas – See also – References

This list is complete through the most recent Alabama Historical Commission listings, posted January 8, 2025.

== Clarke County ==
	Site name	Date listed	City or Town	Built or Established	NRHP/NHL
1	Alston-Cobb-Postma House	September 1, 1978	Grove Hill	c. 1854	NRHP
2	Armistead Home	January 29, 1980	Grove Hill	c. 1843	
3	Bradford-Wilson Home	November 15, 2012	Dickinson	c. 1900	
4	Campbell Historic District	September 30, 1999	Campbell	1870–1950	
5	Cobb-Waite Home	January 29, 1980	Grove Hill vicinity	Late 1860s	NRHP
6	Coffeeville Masonic Lodge	January 22, 2009	Coffeeville	Late 19th century-Mid 20th century	
7	Courthouse Historic District	March 24, 1995	Grove Hill	Earliest 1832	NRHP
8	Dickinson House	January 1, 1978	Grove Hill	c. 1845	NRHP
9	Grant-Carleton House	January 29, 1980	Grove Hill	c. 1850s	
10	Hearin Bush Matthews House	March 1, 2024	Whatley	1852; c. 1999	
11	Johnson House	August 3, 1990	Jackson vicinity	c. 1900	
12	Kimbell-Rivers-Woodson House	September 17, 1976	Jackson	c. 1848	
13	The Lodge (Cleveland Home)	June 9, 1977	Suggsville	c. 1860	
14	Loranz-McCrary House	March 19, 1993	Jackson	c. 1900	
15	Orange Hill Road Historic District	March 24, 1995	Grove Hill	Earliest c. 1845	
16	Pleasant Hill Methodist Church	March 29, 2012	Thomasville	c. 1876	
17	Thomasville High School	August 25, 1994	Thomasville	1929	
18	Upper Confederate Salt Works	July 9, 1976	Jackson vicinity	c. 1861–1865	
19	Wilson-Finch-Mason Log House (non-extant)	April 4, 1978	Manila	c. 1822	
20	Wilson–Finlay House	September 17, 1976	Gainestown	c. 1846	NRHP
21	Wilson's Mill (destroyed by hurricane)	January 25, 1977	Coffeeville vicinity	Late 19th century	
22	Wing-Hudley House	October 20, 1977	Jackson	c. 1879	
23	Woodlands	January 29, 1980	Gosport	c. 1840	NRHP

== Clay County ==
	Site name	Date listed	City or Town	Built or Established	NRHP/NHL
1	Carmichael Place	June 23, 1994	Goodwater	1887	
2	Gay House	April 11, 1984	Ashland	c. 1914	
3	Guthrie's Chapel Methodist Episcopal Church and Cemetery	June 14, 2018		c. 1872	
4	Hatchett Creek Presbyterian Church and Brownsville Cemetery	May 3, 2001	Brownsville	c. 1901–1902	
5	Lineville Water Tower	April 1, 1976	Lineville	c. 1917	
6	Midway School	March 13, 1996	Hollins	1917	
7	Partridge House Complex	February 6, 1998	Goodwater vicinity	1913	

== Cleburne County ==
	Site name	Date listed	City or Town	Built or Established	NRHP/NHL
1	Arbacoochee Site	July 15, 1976	Arbacoochee	Antebellum	
2	Cheaha Observation Tower (Bunker Tower)	December 15, 1989	Cheaha State Park	c. 1934	
3	Colonial Cottage (John Morgan House)	December 19, 1991	Heflin	1880	NRHP
4	Edwardsville Cemetery	October 1, 1997	Edwardsville	Earliest 1837	
5	Heflin Depot	December 21, 1977	Heflin	c. 1886	
6	Old Hale Homeplace and Edwards Farm	December 10, 2020		1850s & 1880	
7	Owen Residence	March 13, 1996	Heflin	19th century	
8	Striplin Gold Mines and Carr Creek Placer	June 21, 2012	Delta	c. 1843	

== Coffee County ==
	Site name	Date listed	City or Town	Built or Established	NRHP/NHL
1	Bethany Primitive Baptist Church	June 14, 2018	Elba	c. 1912	
2	Coffee County Jail	December 1, 2016	Elba	c. 1912	
3	Daleville Avenue Historic District	December 19, 2019	Enterprise	1903-1932	
4	Elba Theatre	March 29, 2018	Elba	c. 1933	
5	Enterprise City School	June 18, 2015	Enterprise	c. 1919	
6	Enterprise Methodist Church (First United Methodist Church)	September 6, 1984	Enterprise	c. 1903–1904	
7	Folsom Home (moved to Elba in 2003 and donated as a museum)	September 17, 1976	Elba vicinity	Late 1800s	
8	Mulberry Heights School (Elba Colored School)	December 1, 2016	Elba vicinity	c. 1958	
9	New Providence Primitive Baptist Church	July 15, 2021	Kinston	c. 1905	
10	Prestwood Grist Mill	October 11, 1978	Roeton vicinity	c. 1848	
11	Rawls House	March 30, 1989	Enterprise	c. 1849	
12	Rawls Warehouse and Cotton Gin	June 12, 2014	Enterprise	1908–1959	
13	The Stinson House (destroyed by fire on July 12, 2021	October 25, 2018	Elba	1903	

== Colbert County ==
	Site name	Date listed	City or Town	Built or Established	NRHP/NHL
1	Church of Christ Site and Cemetery	February 19, 1988	Leighton vicinity	c. 1950s-1960s	
2	Samuel Cooke House (Chambers-Robinson)	April 14, 1992	Sheffield	c. 1895-1900	NRHP
3	FAME Recording Studio	December 15, 1997	Muscle Shoals	1963	NRHP
4	Glencoe Plantation Cemetery	May 26, 1986	Tuscumbia vicinity	c. 1818–1854	
5	Hodge-Blackburn-Twitty House	November 30, 1977	Cherokee	c. 1844	
6	Howell and Graves Junior High School	June 19, 1997	Muscle Shoals	1927	
7	John Johnson House	April 16, 1985	Leighton vicinity	c. 1830	NRHP
8	LaGrange Cemetery	June 23, 1994	Leighton	Earliest 1852	
9	LaGrange College Site	July 16, 1976	Leighton	c. 1830	
10	Leighton Training School (Leighton Middle School)	June 19, 1997	Leighton	1928–1929	
11	Locust Hill (John Daniel Rather House)	October 4, 1978	Tuscumbia	c. 1823	NRHP
12	Melrose (demolished March 2016)	February 20, 1986	Tuscumbia	c. 1830	
13	"Nation" House	April 16, 1985	Sheffield vicinity	c. 1830	
14	Norfolk Southern Railroad Bridge	August 16, 1991	Florence vicinity	1870s	
15	Old Brick Presbyterian Church	November 13, 1978	Leighton vicinity	c. 1830s	
16	Preuit Oaks	November 26, 1978	Leighton vicinity	c. 1847	NRHP
17	Shady Dell	July 15, 2021	Tuscumbia	c. 1920	
18	Shaw Home	June 20, 2013	Leighton	Mid-19th to mid-20th century	
19	Sheffield Railroad Depot	June 23, 1994	Sheffield	1948	
20	Stanfield-Worley Bluff Shelter (1Ct125)	June 18, 2015		Lithic Age (Pre-8000 BCE) to Mississippian Period (800-1600 CE)	
21	Tabie House	November 15, 2012	Leighton	Late 1800s	

== Conecuh County ==
	Site name	Date listed	City or Town	Built or Established	NRHP/NHL
1	Arkadelphia Church	October 4, 1993	Loree vicinity	1886	
2	Belleville Baptist Church	April 21, 1981	Belleville	1841	
3	Betts-Nash House (demolished)	October 4, 1993	Burnt Corn	c. 1835	
4	Brooklyn Baptist Church	March 24, 1983	Brooklyn	c. 1861	
5	Brooklyn Historic District	October 4, 1993	Brooklyn	1826–1865	
6	Brooks-King House	October 4, 1993	Skinnerton	1891	
7	Brushy Creek United Methodist Church	October 4, 1993	Lenox	1850s	
8	Burnett House	October 4, 1993	Evergreen	1880s	
9	Burnt Corn Historic District	October 4, 1993	Burnt Corn	Mid-19th century–Early 20th century	
10	Carey Street Historic District	October 4, 1993	Evergreen	Mid-19th century–Early 20th century	
11	Carter Hospital	December 16, 2010	Repton	c. 1935	
12	Castleberry Commercial District	October 4, 1993	Castleberry		
13	Castleberry Residential District	October 4, 1993	Castleberry		
14	Cohassett Historic District	October 4, 1993	Cohassett	c. 1906	
15	Evergreen Baptist Church	October 4, 1993	Evergreen	c. 1906	
16	Evergreen Regional Airport Beacon	November 13, 1978	Evergreen	c. 1911	
17	Flat Rock Saints Church	May 10, 2000	Evergreen vicinity	c. 1890	
18	Rev. Dr. Hillary James Hawkins House	March 20, 2003	Evergreen	c. 1945	
19	Hawthorne House (demolished)	October 4, 1993	Belleville	1830s	
20	Horton House and Store	October 4, 1993			
21	Robert Ivey House	October 4, 1993	Loree	c. 1850	
22	Jayvilla Commissary (demolished)	October 4, 1993	Evergreen vicinity	c. 1860	
23	Jayvilla Plantation Site	April 1, 1976	Evergreen vicinity	c. 1820	
24	Asa Johnston House	October 4, 1993	Johnstonville	1842	NRHP
25	Caleb Johnston House (demolished)	October 4, 1993	Johnstonville	1840s	
26	Maxwell-Johnson House (demolished)	May 19, 1999	Evergreen		
27	Mt. Union Community Church and Center	November 13, 1996	Evergreen vicinity	c. 1890; 1900	
28	New Evergreen Historic District	October 4, 1993	Evergreen		NRHP
29	Old Beulah Cemetery	October 4, 1993	Evergreen vicinity	1820s–1890s	
30	Old Evergreen Historic District	October 4, 1993	Evergreen		
31	Paul Post Office	June 21, 2013	Paul	c. 1908	
32	Rabb Rosenwald School	February 21, 2013	Rabb	c. 1920	
33	Range Historic District	October 4, 1993	Range	c. 1886	
34	Repton Historic District	October 4, 1993	Repton	Earliest 1886	
35	Dr. H.S. Skinner House	October 4, 1993	Belleville	1821	
36	Sparta Site	October 4, 1993	Evergreen vicinity		
37	St. Mary's Episcopal Church	October 4, 1993	Evergreen	c. 1880	
38	Sunnyside Farm (Witherington House)	July 6, 1978	Evergreen	c. 1856	

== Coosa County ==
	Site name	Date listed	City or Town	Built or Established	NRHP/NHL
1	Coosa County Farmers and Civic Association Building	September 25, 2008		Mid-19th Century	
2	Coosa County Training School	September 26, 2003	Rockford	c. 1929	
3	Double Bridges (demolished)	September 26, 2003	Weogufka vicinity	c. 1934	
4	Franklin Store (Goodwater Feed & Seed)	June 18, 2016	Goodwater	c. 1904	
5	Goodwater Historic District	September 3, 2020	Goodwater	c. 1900-1965	
6	Lay Dam	February 19, 1976	Coosa River	c. 1910–1914	
7	Mims Ferry	September 5, 1975	Coosa River	c. 1895, 1957	
8	Oakachoy Covered Bridge (Destroyed by fire 2001)	October 28, 1977	Nixburg vicinity	c. 1915	Delisted
9	Old Goodwater Train Depot	August 27, 2020	Goodwater	1887	
10	Old Rockford Elementary School	September 30, 1999	Rockford	1927	
11	Old Shiloh Cemetery	March 24, 1995	Nixburg vicinity	1836	
12	James Powell House	November 13, 1996	Rockford	c. 1840	
13	Ray Baptist Church	August 8, 2022	Alexander City	1967	
14	Rockford Women's Club House	March 13, 1996	Rockford	1932	
15	Rockford Tin Mine and Mill	December 19, 2019	Rockford	1941	
16	Smyrna Primitive Baptist Church Cemetery	July 30, 1981	Goodwater	c. 1832	
17	Weogufka State Park	July 18, 1989	Weogufka	c. 1930	NRHP

== Covington County ==
	Site name	Date listed	City or Town	Built or Established	NRHP/NHL
1	Alabama Textile Products Corporation	August 25, 2011	Andalusia	c. 1929	
2	Bethel Primitive Baptist Church and Cemetery	April 18, 2007	Babbie	c. 1920	
3	W. O. Carter Log House	February 27, 1978	Andalusia vicinity	c. 1830s	
4	Church Street School	August 25, 2011	Andalusia	c. 1923	
5	Dixon Home Place	September 29, 2005	Andalusia vicinity	c. 1850	
6	Evers-Caton House	June 23, 2016	Andalusia	c. 1960	
7	First National Bank of Florala (Fidelity Masonic Lodge No. 685)	April 18, 2007	Florala	c. 1907	
8	Givens House	June 30, 1995	Andalusia	c. 1900	
9	Alex Hart House	October 1, 1976	Opp	c. 1901	
10	M. N. Lloyd's Water Mill	August 19, 1976	Red Level vicinity	c. 1930	
11	Macon General Store Museum Collection	January 19, 1978	Andalusia	Early 19th century	
12	Mizzell Mansion	June 27, 2007	Opp	c. 1936-1939	
13	Red Level Methodist Church	August 8, 2022	Red Level	1912	
14	Monch Riley Home	April 19, 2006	Andalusia	c. 1890	
15	River Falls Post Office	October 28, 1977	River Falls	c. 1898	
16	Springdale	August 25, 2001	Andalusia	c. 1937	
17	Stanley School	May 19, 1999	Florala vicinity	1937	
18	The Shack (Old Scout Hut)	June 20, 2013	Andalusia	c. 1922	

== Crenshaw County ==
	Site name	Date listed	City or Town	Built or Established	NRHP/NHL
1	Bricken Building	January 14, 1982	Luverne	c. 1893	
2	Crenshaw County Training School	August 24, 2022	Luverne	1949; 1954-1976	
3	Douglass House (Douglass-Hayden House)	June 30, 1995	Luverne	1904–1907	
4	Freemon-Pinkie Estate	June 27, 2019	Grady	1925	
5	W.W. Hudson House	December 15, 2011	Grady	Mid-to-late 19th century	
6	Ivy Creek School/Community Center	March 12, 1997	Rutledge	1927	
7	Jordan House	October 1, 1976	Highland Home	c. 1889	
8	Mulberry School House	July 15, 2021	Brantley	c. 1920	
9	Old Bryan Place	April 1, 2010	Dozier	1880–1887	
10	Saint John Missionary Baptist Church	June 30, 1995	Luverne	1936; 1965; 2019	

== Cullman County ==
	Site name	Date listed	City or Town	Built or Established	NRHP/NHL
1	Arnold House	February 15, 1977	Cullman	c. 1916	
2	Ave Maria Grotto	February 24, 1976	Cullman	c. 1918	NRHP
3	Baileyton United Methodist Church	December 15, 2011	Baileyton	c. 1947	
4	Battleground School	September 29, 2005	Vinemont	1932	
5	Betz Addition Historic District	March 12, 1997		c. early 20th century	
6	Bogue-Herrell House	February 28, 1979	Cullman	c. 1875	
7	Burkart-Wilson Home	June 23, 1994	Hanceville	1949	
8	Carothers-Brown-Warren House (Perry Warren House)	October 20, 1977	Cullman	c. 1887	
9	Christ Lutheran Church	November 17, 1995	Cullman	1924	
10	Corbin Farmstead	May 19, 1999	Joppa	1894	
11	Crane Hill Masonic Lodge #554	February 25, 1999	Crane Hill	1904	NRHP
12	Cottingham-Benson House	May 10, 1978	Cullman	c. 1905	
13	Cullman Ice Factory	February 27, 1978	Cullman	c. 1894	
14	Colonel John G. Cullman Home	August 29, 1975	Cullman	c. 1870	
15	Deep South Creamery	October 28, 1985	Cullman	c. 1900	
16	John B. Deerr House	June 23, 1994	Cullman	1938	
17	Evangelical Lutheran Trinity Church/Burkart Memorial Hall	September 6, 1984	Hanceville	1885–1886	
18	First United Methodist Church	June 16, 1981	Cullman	c. 1924	
19	Fuller-St. John-Edwards House	October 17, 1980	Cullman	c. 1914	
20	Garden City School	May 19, 1999	Garden City	1898	
21	Green-Owens House	February 20, 1986	Cullman	1913–1914	NRHP
22	Green-Jennings House (Destroyed by fire)	February 27, 1978	Cullman	c. 1890–1893	
23	Guthrie–Holden Farm	November 9, 2017	Joppa	c. 1938	
24	Hancock House	November 17, 1995	Cullman vicinity	1898	
25	Heitmueller Farm	March 8, 1994	Vinemont	1873	
26	Joppa Collegiate Normal Institute (Reconstructed 2001)	March 20, 2003	Joppa	c. 1900–1918	
27	Kleibacher-Wachter House	November 17, 1995	Cullman	1909	
28	Logan Jr. High School	August 5, 2010	Logan	1943	
29	Mace Thomas Payne Brindley Cemetery	September 29, 1975	Simcoe vicinity	Earliest 1853	
30	McDonald House	November 26, 1978	Cullman	c. 1890	
31	Mullins-Young-Rigsby House	November 17, 1995	Cullman	1911–12	
32	Old Wagner Studio	August 6, 1993	Cullman	1903	
33	Parker-Hutchens House	March 20, 1981	Cullman	c. 1877	
34	Peinhardt Farm	April 1, 2010	Cullman	1933	
35	Potato House	September 29, 2005	Hanceville	c. 1900	
36	Rambow-Abt House	January 31, 1979	Cullman	c. 1907	
37	Sacred Heart Catholic Church	November 5, 1976	Cullman	c. 1900	
38	Saint John's United Church	December 21, 1977	Cullman	c. 1924	
39	Sandlin Chapel	August 22, 1985	Bremen	c. 1882	
40	Sears Roebuck Building	March 1, 2024	Cullman	c. 1930	
41	Shady Grove Methodist Church	February 25, 1999	Logan vicinity	1892–1893	NRHP
42	Sparks-Kinney-Hartwig House	April 11, 1978	Cullman	c. 1903	
43	Issac Speegle Farmstead	August 25, 2011	Guthery Crossroads	c. 1910	
44	Steindorff-Glasscock House	May 10, 1978	Cullman	c. 1899–1900	
45	Stiefelmeyer-Allred House	February 27, 1978	Cullman	c. 1886	
46	Stiefelmeyer Home (demolished)	April 14, 1978	Cullman	c. 1880	
47	Stiefelmeyer's, Inc.	January 19, 1978	Cullman	1892	NRHP
48	Vogel-Peinhardt House	July 7, 1980	Cullman	c. 1929	
49	Wagner-Abbott House	February 4, 2000	Cullman	1889	
50	Weiss House	January 25, 1977	Cullman	c. 1873	

== Dale County ==
	Site name	Date listed	City or Town	Built or Established	NRHP/NHL
1	Joseph E. Acker House	September 29, 2005	Ozark	c. 1920	
2	Ariton Universalist Church	March 23, 1990	Ariton	c. 1913	
3	Clopton United Methodist Church and Cemetery	September 28, 2000	Clopton	1924	
4	Eagle Stadium	March 29, 2012	Ozark	c. 1946	
5	Kolb-Chesser Home (Leonidas William Kolb House)	April 14, 1978	Ozark	c. 1908	
6	Mack M. Matthews School (Pinckard Colored School; South Dale Jr. High School)	August 25, 2011		c. 1961	
7	Ozark Racetrack	May 8, 1975	Ozark	c. 1893–1908	
8	Pleasant Grove Primitive Baptist Church	June 19, 1997	Ozark	c. 1841	
9	D. A. Smith High School	June 14, 2018	Ozark	c. 1952	
10	Spring Hill Methodist Church	August 13, 1987	Ozark vicinity	c. 1876	
11	Veterans Memorial Bridge	May 17, 1977	Pea River	c. 1921	

== Dallas County ==
	Site name	Date listed	City or Town	Built or Established	NRHP/NHL
1	Alabama Baptist Normal and Theological School	June 19, 1997	Selma	c. 1878–1948	
2	Bailey-Mayo Store (demolished)	November 2, 1990	Pleasant Hill		
3	Bakke Hall and the Dormitory, Alabama Lutheran Academy	June 19, 1997	Selma	c. 1928	
4	Beloit Industrial Institute (Dallas County Training School)	August 6, 1993	Beloit	1929–30	
5	Belvoir (Saffold Plantation)	November 2, 1990	Pleasant Hill	1845-1855	
6	Belvoir Superintendent's House	November 2, 1990	Pleasant Hill		
7	Boguechitto Institute	March 29, 2012	Marion Junction	c. 1955	
8	Boynton Residence	September 25, 2008	Selma	c. 1935	
9	J.R. Bragg House	November 2, 1990	Pleasant Hill		
10	Brown Chapel A.M.E. Church	June 16, 1976	Selma	c. 1906	NHL
11	Browning House	November 2, 1990	Pleasant Hill		
12	Burwell–Dinkins–Anderson House	March 26, 2015	Selma	c. 1889	
13	Butler-Rives House	November 2, 1990	Pleasant Hill		
14	Campsite I-David Hall Complex	September 16, 2021	Selma	c. 1940; 1965	
15	Cedar Acres (Maxwell-Carter House)	November 2, 1990	Pleasant Hill		
16	Cedar Creek Bridge	November 2, 1990	Pleasant Hill		
17	Civil War Underwater Site (no public access)	March 29, 2012	Alabama River	c. 1861–1865	
18	Clark Elementary School	June 14, 2018	Selma	c. 1956	
19	Clinton Chapel AME Zion Church	March 26, 2015	Selma	c. 1975	
20	Craig–Wilson House (Mooreland)	February 12, 2015	Selma	c. 1840–1890	
21	Dunaway Meyer House	April 14, 1978	Orrville	1895	
22	East End Elementary School	December 19, 2019	Selma	1962	
23	Ebenezer Missionary Baptist Church	March 25, 2015	Selma	c. 1974	
24	Eden	July 21, 1978	Richmond vicinity	c. 1840	
25	Everdale Baptist Church	September 28, 2004	Burnsville	1925	
26	Fuller Home (The Homestead)	October 19, 1979	Selma	c. 1898–1913	
27	Girl Scout Hut	February 27, 1978	Selma	c. 1929	
28	Good Hope Baptist Church (demolished c. 2005)	February 6, 1998	Browns	1905	
29	Green Street Baptist Church	March 13, 1996	Selma	1892	
30	Green Underwood House	November 2, 1990	Pleasant Hill	c. 1845	
31	W. C. Harrell Store (demolished prior to 1997)	November 2, 1990	Pleasant Hill		
32	House at 601 Washington Street (Plattenburg-Kirkpatrick House)	March 22, 1991	Selma	1855	NRHP
33	Howorth Home	January 14, 1980	Selma	1928	NRHP
34	Hurricane Creek Bridge	November 2, 1990	Pleasant Hill		
35	Jackson Home	June 21, 2012	Selma	c. 1910	
36	Kenan's Mill	April 28, 1978	Selma vicinity	c. 1835	
37	Martin Luther King Jr. Street Church of God	July 7, 1980	Selma	c. 1900	
38	Frank Lewis House	November 2, 1990	Pleasant Hill		
39	Little Canaan Primitive Baptist Church	March 26, 2015	Selma	c. 1933	
40	Live Oak Cemetery	March 25, 1976	Selma	1828-1963	
41	Louretta Johnson Carter House	March 26, 2015	Selma	c. 1930	
42	Magnolias (Crumpton House)	November 2, 1990	Pleasant Hill	c. 1852	
43	Maxwell-Fail House	November 2, 1990	Pleasant Hill		
44	McMillan-Oxford Home	October 7, 1998	Orrville vicinity	c. 1858	
45	Morning Star Baptist Church	March 26, 2015	Selma	c. 1968	
46	Mount Zion Primitive Baptist Church	March 26, 2015	Selma	c. 1912	
47	New Sister Baptist Church	May 19, 2023	Selma	c. 1958	
48	Northern Heights Presbyterian Church	March 26, 2015	Selma	c. 1960	
49	Old Methodist Church (demolished c. 2006-2011)	November 2, 1990	Pleasant Hill		
50	Plattenburg-Kirkpatrick House	March 22, 1991	Selma	1842	NRHP
51	Pleasant Hill Baptist Church	November 2, 1990	Pleasant Hill		
52	Pleasant Hill Presbyterian Church	November 2, 1990	Pleasant Hill	1851–1852	NRHP
53	Pollard–Brown House	March 26, 2015	Selma	c. 1890	
54	Pope-Givhan House	August 27, 2020	Safford	c. 1830s	
55	Prosperity CME Church	September 27, 2007	Orrville vicinity	1913	
56	Providence School	April 1, 2010	Orrville	c. 1920	
57	R.B. Hudson High School	June 20, 2013	Selma	c. 1949	
58	Dr. F. D. Reece House	June 14, 2018	Selma	1870s	
59	Saffold-Middleton-Moore House	November 2, 1990	Pleasant Hill		
60	Safford Community House	June 14, 2018	Safford	c. 1917	
61	Saint Paul CME Church	March 26, 2015	Selma	c. 1891	
62	Second Baptist Church	March 13, 2016	Selma	c. 1976	
63	Sinclair-Harrell House	November 2, 1990	Pleasant Hill		
64	Stoutenborough Hall (Anthony Stoutenborough House)	July 18, 1989	Richmond vicinity	c. 1850	
65	Street Manual Training School	March 12, 1997	Richmond vicinity	1904–1947	NRHP
66	Tabernacle Baptist Church	June 19, 1996	Selma	1922	NRHP
67	Ulmer House	November 2, 1990	Pleasant Hill		
68	United Methodist Children's Home (Selma Military Institute)	July 7, 1980	Selma	c. 1906	
69	Vasser-Ellis House (demolished)	November 2, 1990	Pleasant Hill		
70	Ward Chapel AME Church	August 5, 2010	Selma	1949	
71	Warren Family Home	March 8, 2023	Selma	c. 1950	
72	Watson House	May 28, 2009	Orrville	c. 1915	
73	West Trinity Missionary Baptist Church	March 26, 2015	Selma	c. 1953	
74	George and Jewell Wilson Building (demolished)	January 22, 2009	Selma		

== See also ==
- Properties on the Alabama Register of Landmarks and Heritage by county (Autauga–Choctaw)
- Properties on the Alabama Register of Landmarks and Heritage by county (DeKalb–Jackson)
- Properties on the Alabama Register of Landmarks and Heritage by county (Jefferson–Macon)
- Properties on the Alabama Register of Landmarks and Heritage by county (Madison–Perry)
- Properties on the Alabama Register of Landmarks and Heritage by county (Pickens–Winston)
