= National Register of Historic Places listings in Cullman County, Alabama =

Location of Cullman County in Alabama

This is a list of the National Register of Historic Places listings in Cullman County, Alabama.

This is intended to be a complete list of the properties and districts on the National Register of Historic Places in Cullman County, Alabama, United States. Latitude and longitude coordinates are provided for many National Register properties and districts; these locations may be seen together in a Google map.

There are nine properties and districts listed on the National Register in the county.

This National Park Service list is complete through NPS recent listings posted January 2, 2026.

	Name on the Register	Image	Date listed	Location	City or town	Description
1	Ave Maria Grotto	Ave Maria Grotto	January 19, 1984 (#84000610)	St. Bernard Abbey; 34°10′28″N 86°48′58″W	Cullman	
2	Clarkson Bridge	Clarkson Bridge	June 25, 1974 (#74000408)	West of Cullman; 34°12′27″N 86°59′28″W	Cullman	
3	Crane Hill Masonic Lodge	Crane Hill Masonic Lodge	November 29, 2001 (#01001294)	14538 County Road 222; 34°05′49″N 87°03′16″W	Crane Hill	
4	Cullman Downtown Commercial Historic District	Cullman Downtown Commercial Historic District	April 11, 1985 (#85000738)	Roughly bounded by 4th and 1st Aves. and 2nd and 5th Sts., SE. 34°10′33″N 86°50′24″W	Cullman	
5	Cullman Historic District	Cullman Historic District	August 30, 1984 (#84000615)	Roughly bounded by 1st and 8th Aves. and 3rd and 9th Sts. 34°10′26″N 86°49′58″W	Cullman	
6	Ernest Edward Greene House	Ernest Edward Greene House	February 3, 1993 (#92001828)	105 6th Ave., SE. 34°10′45″N 86°50′16″W	Cullman	
7	Louisville and Nashville Railroad Depot	Louisville and Nashville Railroad Depot	June 17, 1976 (#76000320)	309 1st Ave., NE. 34°10′48″N 86°50′39″W	Cullman	
8	Shady Grove Methodist Church and Cemetery	Shady Grove Methodist Church and Cemetery	October 3, 2002 (#02001067)	Ruby Community 3.7 miles west of Logan; 34°08′29″N 87°02′08″W	Logan	
9	Stiefelmeyer's	Stiefelmeyer's	December 22, 1983 (#83003444)	202 1st Ave., SE. 34°10′35″N 86°50′32″W	Cullman	

== See also ==
- List of National Historic Landmarks in Alabama
- National Register of Historic Places listings in Alabama
