= Saffold =

Saffold may refer to:

- Saffold virus, single-stranded RNA human virus
- Saffold Dam, dam in Seguin, Texas
- Belvoir (Saffold Plantation), historic plantation in Pleasant Hill, Alabama, United States
- Saffold (surname)
