= Justice Saffold =

Justice Saffold may refer to:

- Benjamin F. Saffold (1826–1889), associate justice of the Alabama Supreme Court
- Reuben Saffold (1788–1847), associate justice and chief justice of the Alabama Supreme Court

== See also ==
- Jacob Safford (1827–1885), associate justice of the Kansas Supreme Court
