= Saffold (surname) =

Saffold is a surname. Notable people with the surname include:

- Benjamin F. Saffold (1826–1889), Alabama Supreme Court Justice
- Monroe Saffold Jr. (born 1948), American body builder
- Reuben Saffold (1788–1847), Chief Justice of the Supreme Court of Alabama
- Rodger Saffold (born 1988), American football player
- Saint Saffold (born 1944), American football player
