= CCPLS =

CCPLS may refer to:

- Cobb County Public Library System in Cobb County, Georgia
- Cullman County Public Library System in Cullman County, Alabama
- Campbell County Public Library System in Campbell County, Wyoming
