= Pleasant Hill, Alabama =

Unincorporated community in Alabama, United States

- Unincorporated community
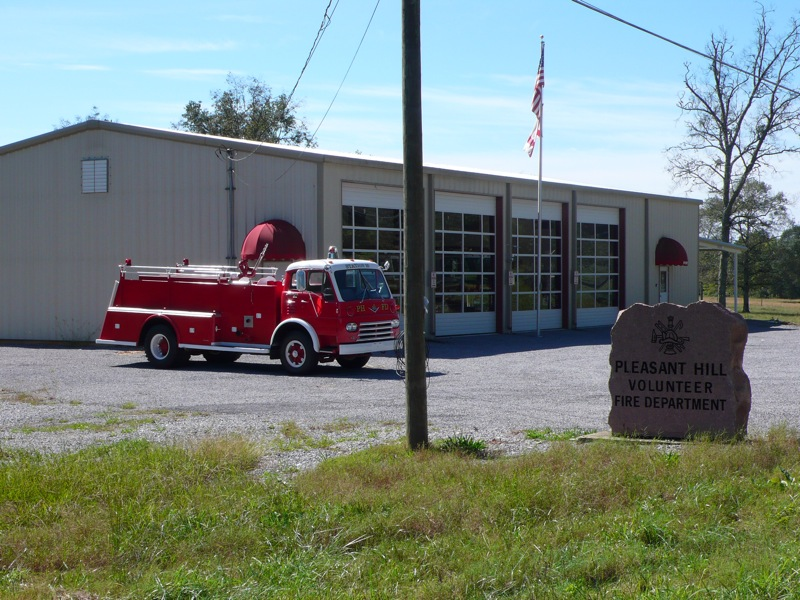
- Pleasant Hill Alabama Volunteer Fire Department

- Location in Alabama Pleasant Hill (the United States)
- Coordinates: 32°09′56″N 86°54′43″W
- Country: United States
- State: Alabama
- County: Dallas
- Elevation: 404 ft (123 m)
- Time zone: UTC-6 (Central (CST))
  - Summer (DST): UTC-5 (CDT)
- ZIP code: 36775
- Area code: 251
- GNIS feature ID: 155207

Pleasant Hill is an unincorporated community in Dallas County, Alabama.

== History ==
The community began as a trading post called Fort Rascal prior to the Indian removal. It gained a post office in 1828 and the name was changed to Pleasant Hill. The community was visited by Philip Henry Gosse, an English naturalist, for an eight-month period in 1838 when he taught school for Reuben Saffold, a planter who owned Belvoir and ajustice of the Supreme Court of Alabama. His studies and drawings of the flora and fauna of the area and his recollections of slavery were later published in his book Letters from Alabama. Pleasant Hill has one site included on the National Register of Historic Places, the Pleasant Hill Presbyterian Church. It has several sites listed on the Alabama Register of Landmarks and Heritage and one nearby, Belvoir.

== Demographics ==
Historical population
Census	Pop.	Note	%±
1880	193		—
U.S. Decennial Census

Pleasant Hill was listed on the 1880 U.S. Census as having a population of 193.

== Notable people ==
- Sidney Johnston Catts, 22nd Governor of Florida
- Johnnie Cowan, infielder in Negro league baseball
