= Cullman Downtown Commercial Historic District =

Historic district in Alabama, United States

- U.S. National Register of Historic Places
- U.S. Historic district
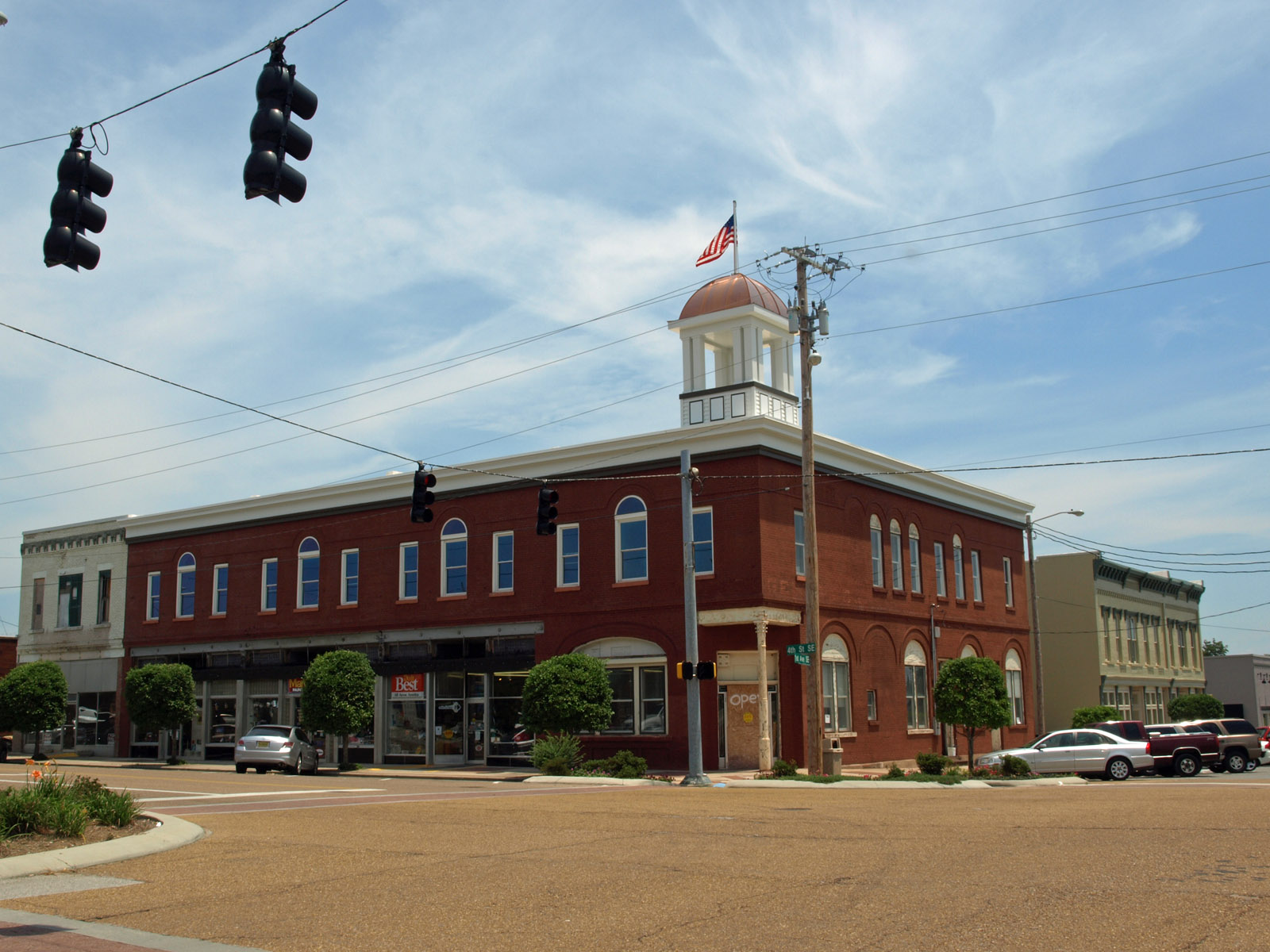
- Buildings along 1st Avenue & 4th Street in July 2012

- Location within Alabama Location within the United States
- Location: Roughly bounded by 4th and 1st Aves., 2nd and 5th Sts. SE, Cullman, Alabama
- Coordinates: 34°10′33″N 86°50′24″W
- Area: 11 acres (4.5 ha)
- Architectural style: Late 19th And 20th Century Revivals, Late Victorian, Brick Commercial
- NRHP reference No.: 85000738
- Added to NRHP: April 11, 1985

The Cullman Downtown Commercial Historic District is a historic district in Cullman, Alabama, United States. Cullman was founded in 1873 by John G. Cullmann, who purchased land from the Louisville and Nashville Railroad. Most early commercial buildings were constructed of wood, with the first brick building, a hotel and restaurant across from the L&N depot, completed in 1881. Most of the early wooden buildings burned, including the C. A. Stiefelmeyer Storehouse in 1892, which was replaced with the current Stiefelmeyer's building. A new post office building was constructed in 1910, at the same time as a major boom in construction. Following a lull during World War I, construction continued in the 1920s, including the First United Methodist Church in 1923. The majority of the 58 contributing structures in the district are one- or two-story brick buildings in basic commercial styles, some influenced by the Chicago School. Notable exceptions are the wooden Italianate Stiefelmeyer's building, the stone Gothic Revival First Methodist Church, and the Neoclassical Federal Building and German Bank building's corner cupola.

The district was listed on the National Register of Historic Places in 1985.
