= Greene-Lewis House =

Historic house in Florida, United States

- U.S. National Register of Historic Places
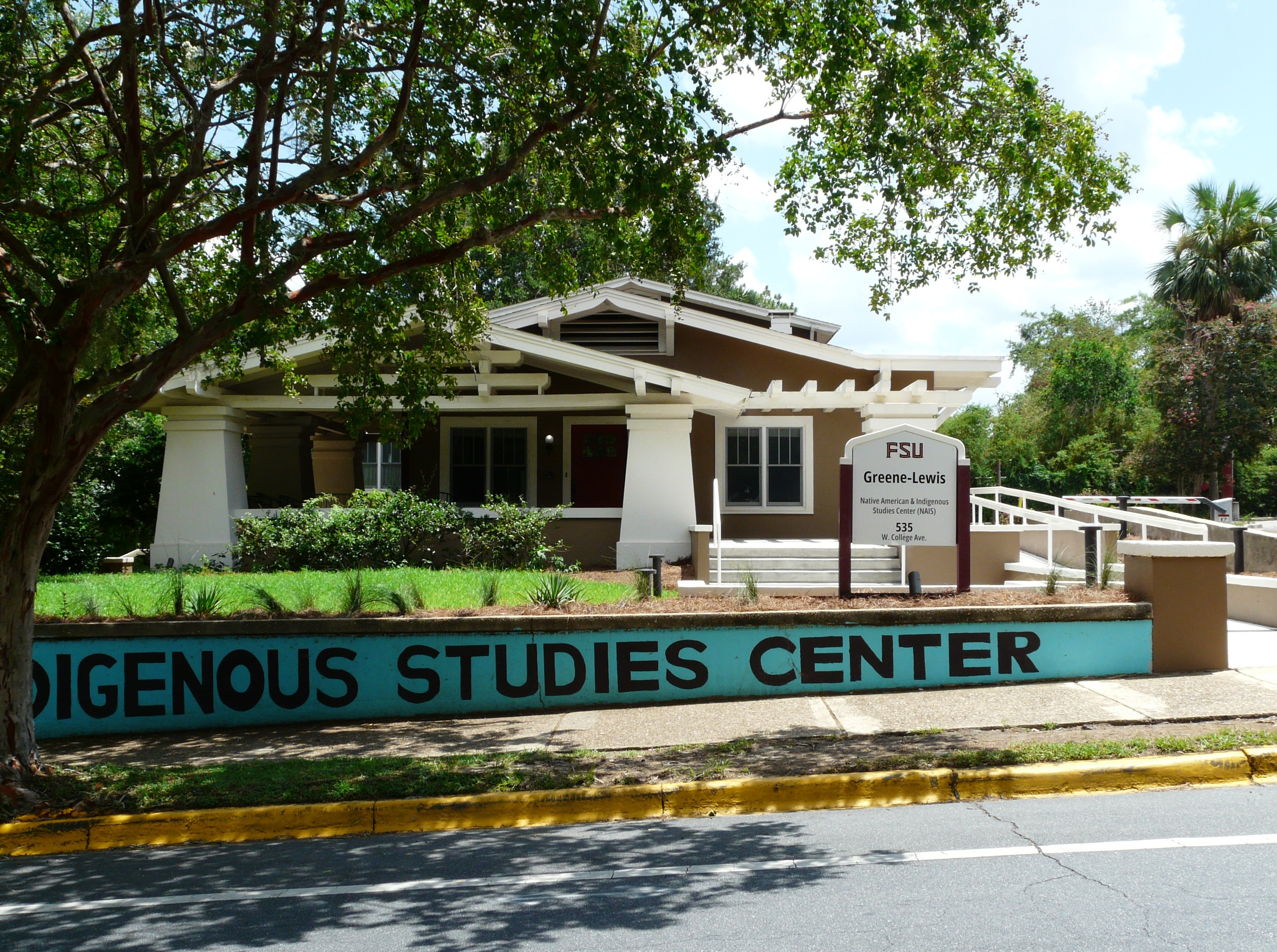

- Location within Florida Location within the United States
- Location: Tallahassee, Florida
- Coordinates: 30°26′24″N 84°17′24″W
- Architectural style: Bungalow/Craftsman
- NRHP reference No.: 98000677
- Added to NRHP: June 11, 1998

The Greene-Lewis House is a historic home in Tallahassee, Florida. It is located at 535 West College Avenue. On June 11, 1998, it was added to the U.S. National Register of Historic Places.

Since 2024, it has been the location of Florida State University's Native American and Indigenous Studies Center.
