= Cullman County Public Library System =

The Cullman County Public Library System (CCPLS) is a public library system located in north central Alabama. The main branch is located in Downtown Cullman, Alabama. The library system consists of five branch locations and bookmobile service that serves all of Cullman County, Alabama. The library system is guided by the Public Library Board of Cullman County consisting of five board members. The five board members are appointed by the Cullman County Commission and serve four year terms.

== History of the Cullman County Library System ==
In 1890, Coronel John G. Cullmann appointed Professor S. A. Felton to head the first public library housed on the campus of the Cullman Polytechnic Institute. Sometime between 1894, when the public library moved to Allison's Drug Store, and in 1928, the library was disbanded and attempts to reopen the library were unsuccessful. In 1928, the new library opened in two rooms above Stiefelmeyer's after members of the Coterie Club raised funds for a new library through bridge parties and solicited book donations from the community. From 1928 until 1967, the library moved several times, to include the basement of the Fuller Building and the current City Hall Annex. Cullman County joined with Winston County, Alabama in 1952, forming the Cullman-Winston Regional Library Board, to provide rural bookmobile service to the residents of both counties. Bookmobile service continued, though Winston County decided to no longer participate in 1958, for Cullman County residents through 1981.

== Branches ==
There are five branches throughout Cullman County which offer youth, children and adult programs, a "Borrow a Librarian" service that offers one-on-one technology assistance, free WIFI and computer access, and genealogy resources.

Cullman Library

Located in downtown Cullman.

Garden City Library

Located in the Garden City Municipal Building in southern Cullman County.

Hanceville Library

Located in the old Merchants Bank building in downtown Hanceville, Alabama.

Tom Bevill Library

Located in the Tom Bevill Educational Center in Colony, Alabama.

Guy Hunt Library

Located in Holly Pond, Alabama.
