= Greene Thomas House =

Historic house in Arkansas, United States

- U.S. National Register of Historic Places
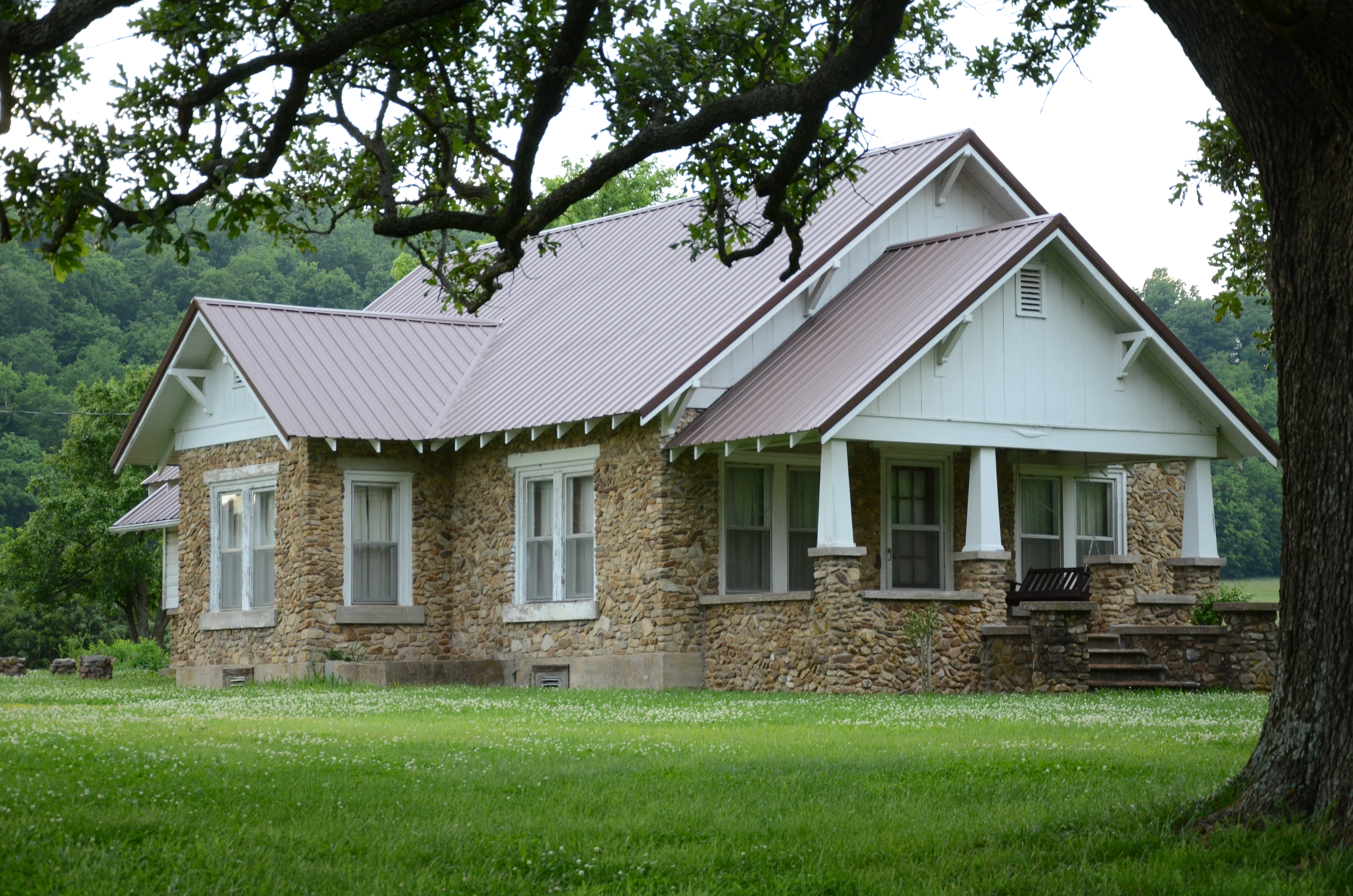

- Location within Arkansas Location within the United States
- Nearest city: Leslie, Arkansas
- Coordinates: 35°51′32″N 92°33′58″W
- Area: 2 acres (0.81 ha)
- Built: 1930
- Built by: Dan McInturff (house); Calvin Stephenson (barn)
- Architectural style: Bungalow/American craftsman
- MPS: Searcy County MPS
- NRHP reference No.: 93000755
- Added to NRHP: August 18, 1993

The Greene Thomas House is a historic house in rural Searcy County, Arkansas. It is located north of Leslie, on the west side of County Road 74 south of its junction with County Road 55. It is a single-story stone structure, fashioned out of smooth rounded creek stones. It has a front-facing gable roof with an extended gable supported by large brackets, and a porch with a similar gable, supported by sloping square wooden columns. Built in 1930, it is a fine regional example of Craftsman style architecture in a rural context.

The house was listed on the National Register of Historic Places in 1993.

== See also ==
- National Register of Historic Places listings in Searcy County, Arkansas
