= John T. Greene House =

Historic house in California, United States

- U.S. National Register of Historic Places
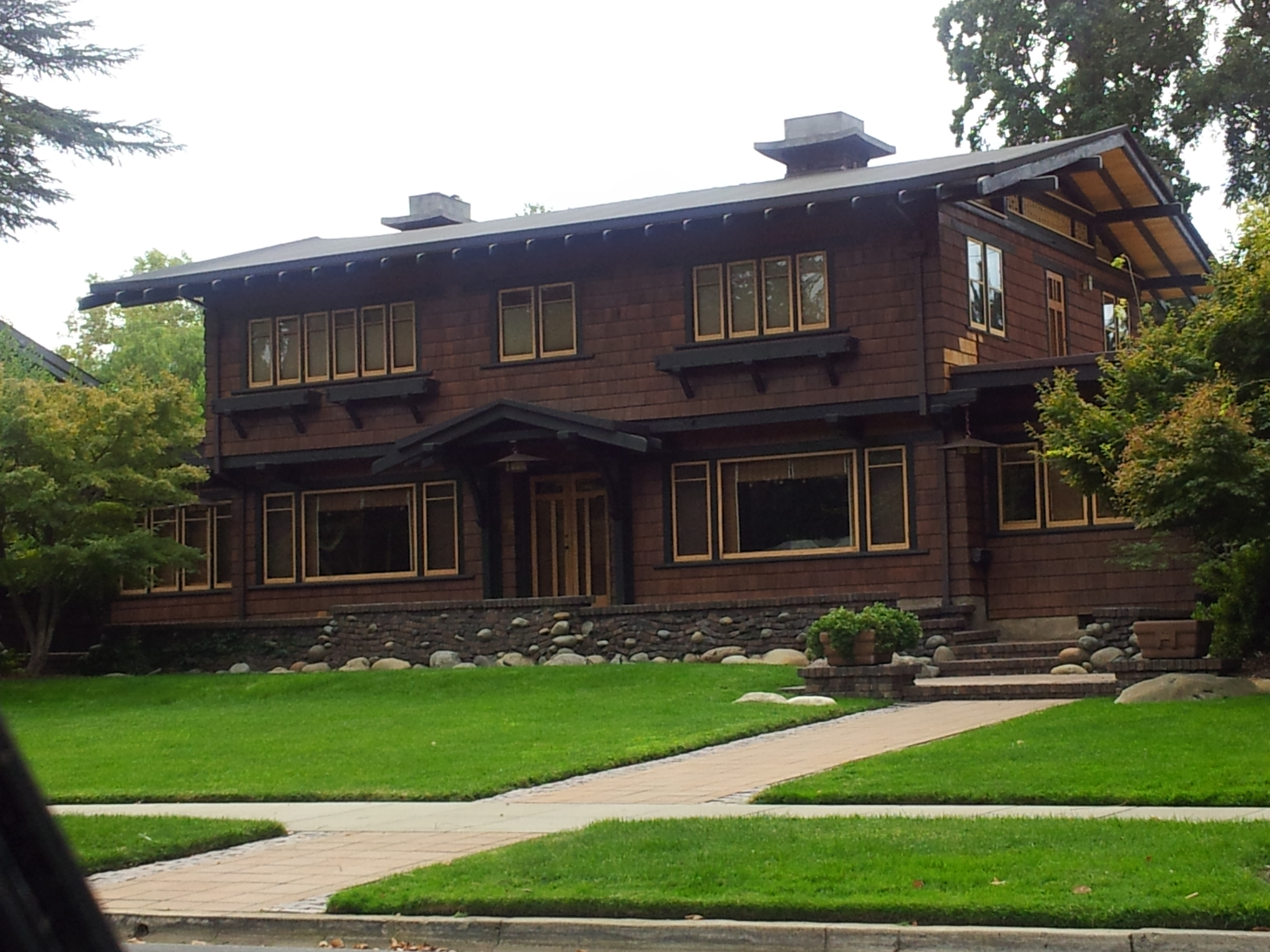

- Location within Sacramento, California Location within California Location within the United States
- Location: 3200 H St., Sacramento, California
- Coordinates: 38°34′27.9″N 121°27′46.9″W
- Area: .275 acres (0.111 ha)
- Built: 1925
- Architect: Greene and Greene
- Architectural style: American Craftsman
- NRHP reference No.: 82002231
- Added to NRHP: April 15, 1982

The John T. Greene House located in Sacramento, California is a historic house, designed in the American Craftsman style by Pasadena architectural firm Greene & Greene for Sacramento real estate developer John T. Greene.
