= Johnsonville, Alabama =

Unincorporated community in Brownsville, Alabama

- Unincorporated community
- Location within Alabama Location within the United States
- Coordinates: 31°17′41″N 86°52′20″W
- Country: United States
- State: Alabama
- County: Conecuh
- Elevation: 289 ft (88 m)
- Time zone: UTC-6 (Central (CST))
  - Summer (DST): UTC-5 (CDT)
- Area code: 251
- GNIS feature ID: 155325

Johnsonville, also known as Johnstonville, Franklintown, or Zeru, is an unincorporated community in Conecuh County, Alabama, United States.

== History ==
A post office operated under the name Zeru from 1893 to 1908.

The Asa Johnston Farmhouse, which is listed on the Alabama Register of Landmarks and Heritage and the National Register of Historic Places, is located in Johnsonville.
