= Pleasant Hill Presbyterian Church =

Historic church in Alabama, United States

- U.S. National Register of Historic Places
- Alabama Register of Landmarks and Heritage
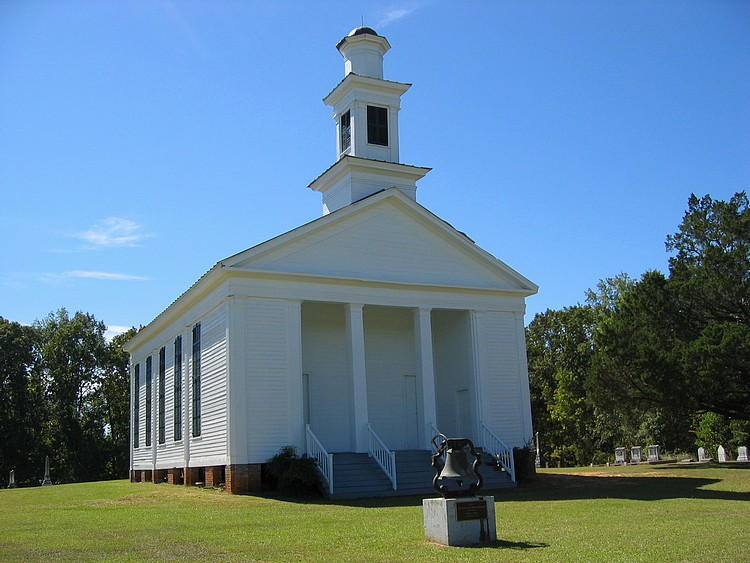
- The church in 2007

- Location within Alabama Location within the United States
- Location: O.2 mi. E of jct. of Cty. Rd. 7 and Cty. Rd. 12, Pleasant Hill, Alabama
- Coordinates: 32°9′53″N 86°54′30″W
- Built: 1851
- Architectural style: Greek Revival
- NRHP reference No.: 99000465

Significant dates
- Added to NRHP: April 22, 1999
- Designated ARLH: November 2, 1990

The Pleasant Hill Presbyterian Church, originally known as Mount Carmel Presbyterian Church, is a historic Greek Revival church in Pleasant Hill, Alabama, United States. The current structure was built between 1851 and 1852. It features a distyle-in-antis type portico with simple box columns, a bell tower topped by a small domed cupola, and a second-floor balcony around three sides of the interior. It was placed on the Alabama Register of Landmarks and Heritage on the November 2, 1990 and on the National Register of Historic Places on April 22, 1999.

== See also ==
- National Register of Historic Places listings in Dallas County, Alabama
- Historical Marker Database
