= Weogufka, Alabama =

- Census-designated place
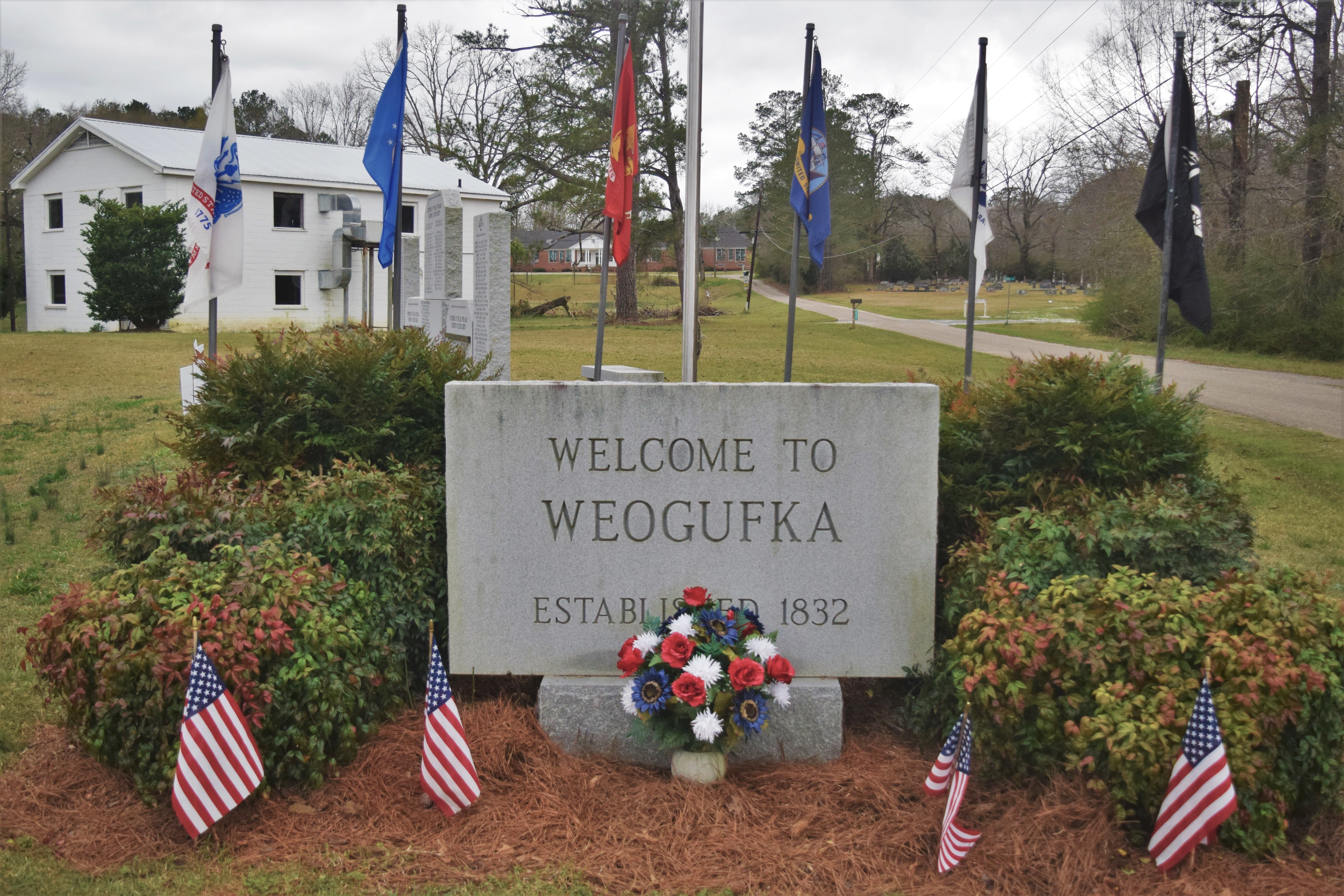
- Weogufka in 2021

- Location of Weogufka in Coosa County, Alabama.
- Coordinates: 33°00′07″N 86°18′20″W
- Country: United States
- State: Alabama
- County: Coosa

Area
  - Total: 5.19 sq mi (13.45 km^{2})
  - Land: 5.13 sq mi (13.28 km^{2})
  - Water: 0.062 sq mi (0.16 km^{2})
- Elevation: 646 ft (197 m)

Population (2020)
  - Total: 207
  - Density: 40.4/sq mi (15.58/km^{2})
- Time zone: UTC-6 (Central (CST))
  - Summer (DST): UTC-5 (CDT)
- Postal code: 35183
- Area codes: 256 & 938
- GNIS feature ID: 2582706

Weogufka is a census-designated place and unincorporated community in Coosa County, Alabama, United States. Its population was 207 as of the 2020 census.

== Etymology ==
The town's name comes from the Muscogee place name Ue-Okofke, meaning "muddy water".

== Demographics ==
Historical population
Census	Pop.	Note	%±
1920	171		—
2010	282		—
2020	207		−26.6%
U.S. Decennial Census

Weogufka was previously listed on the 1920 U.S. Census as an incorporated community. It did not appear again on the census until 2010 when it was listed as a census designated place in the 2010 U.S. census. The name means 'muddy water' in the Muskogee language.

Weogufka CDP, Alabama – Racial and ethnic composition Note: the US Census treats Hispanic/Latino as an ethnic category. This table excludes Latinos from the racial categories and assigns them to a separate category. Hispanics/Latinos may be of any race.
Race / Ethnicity (NH = Non-Hispanic)	Pop 2010	Pop 2020	% 2010	% 2020
White alone (NH)	278	196	98.58%	94.69%
Black or African American alone (NH)	0	0	0.00%	0.00%
Native American or Alaska Native alone (NH)	0	0	0.00%	0.00%
Asian alone (NH)	1	0	0.35%	0.00%
Native Hawaiian or Pacific Islander alone (NH)	0	0	0.00%	0.00%
Other race alone (NH)	0	2	0.00%	0.97%
Mixed race or Multiracial (NH)	0	7	0.00%	3.38%
Hispanic or Latino (any race)	3	2	1.06%	0.97%
Total	282	207	100.00%	100.00%

== Gallery ==
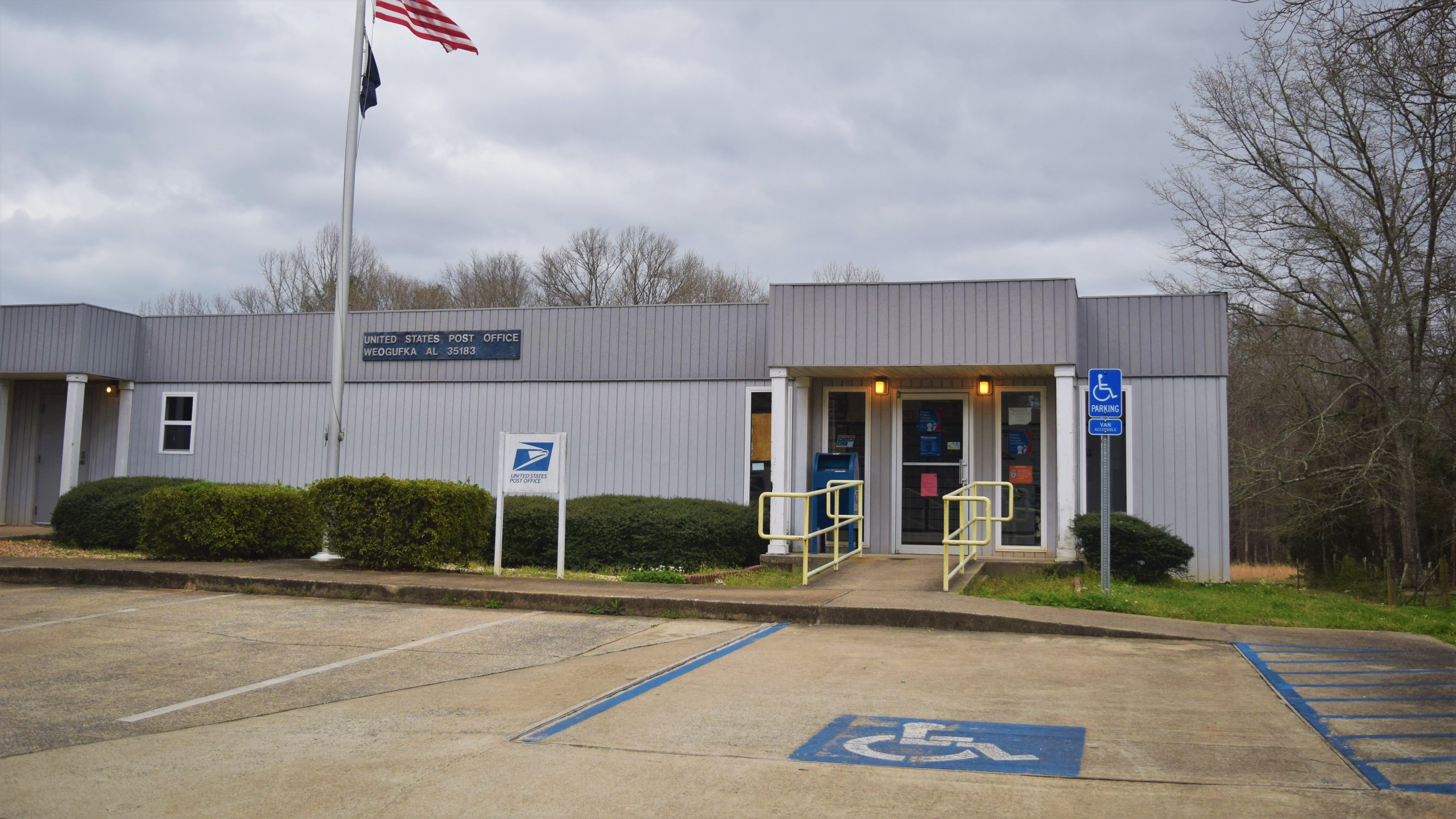
Weogufka Post Office (ZIP code: 35183)

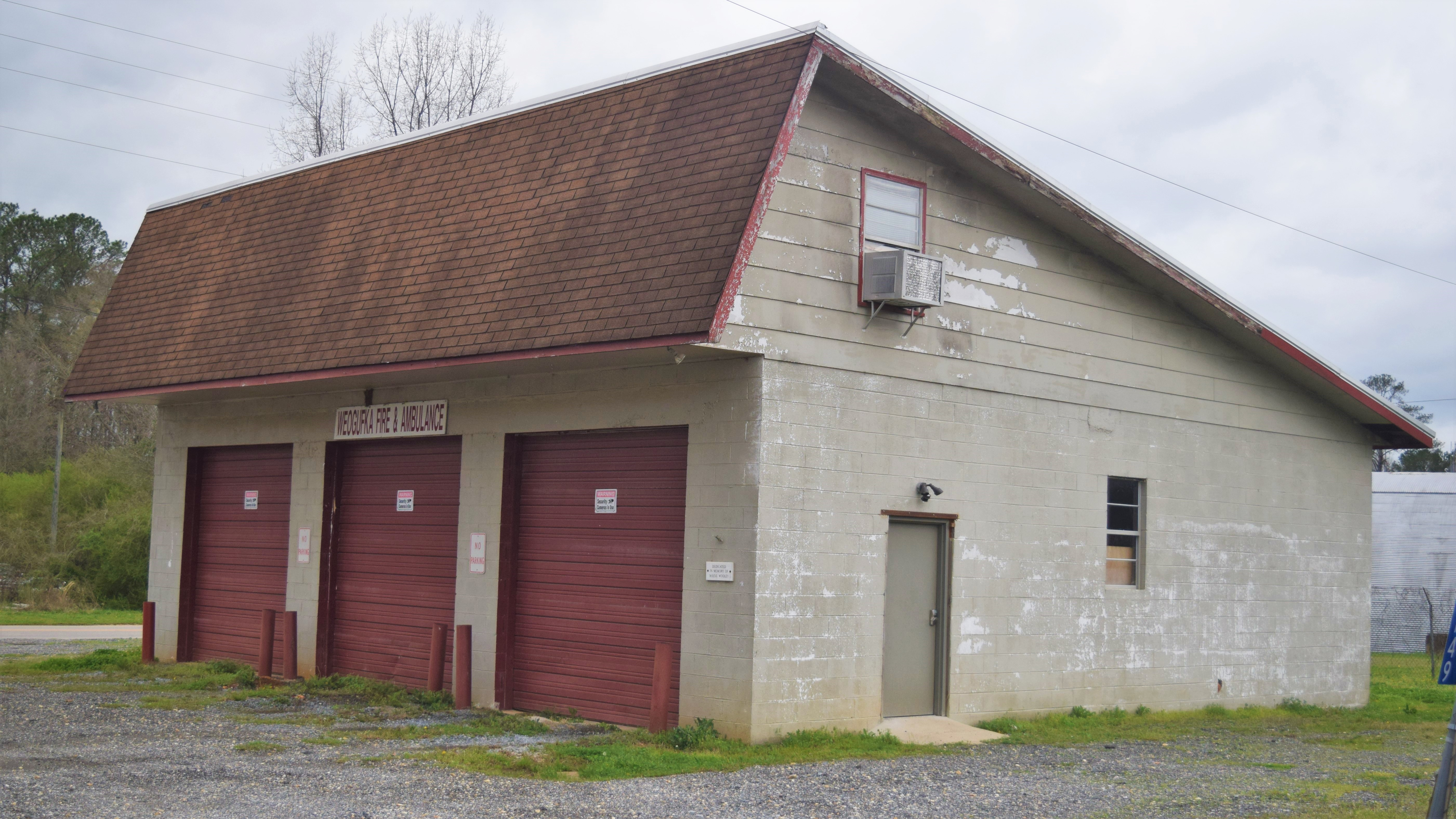
Weogufka Volunteer Fire Department

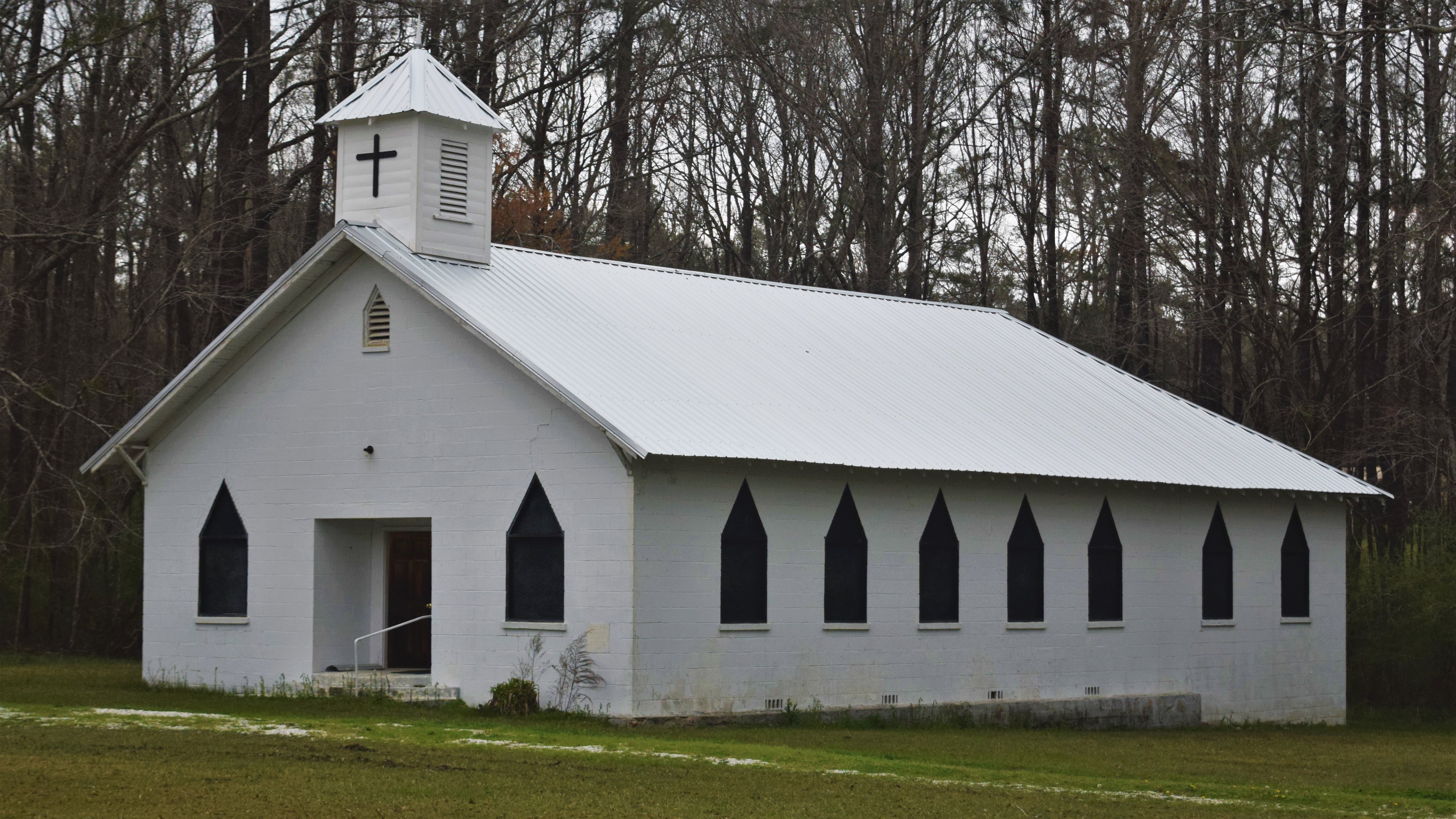
The Weogufka Methodist Church was built in 1948.

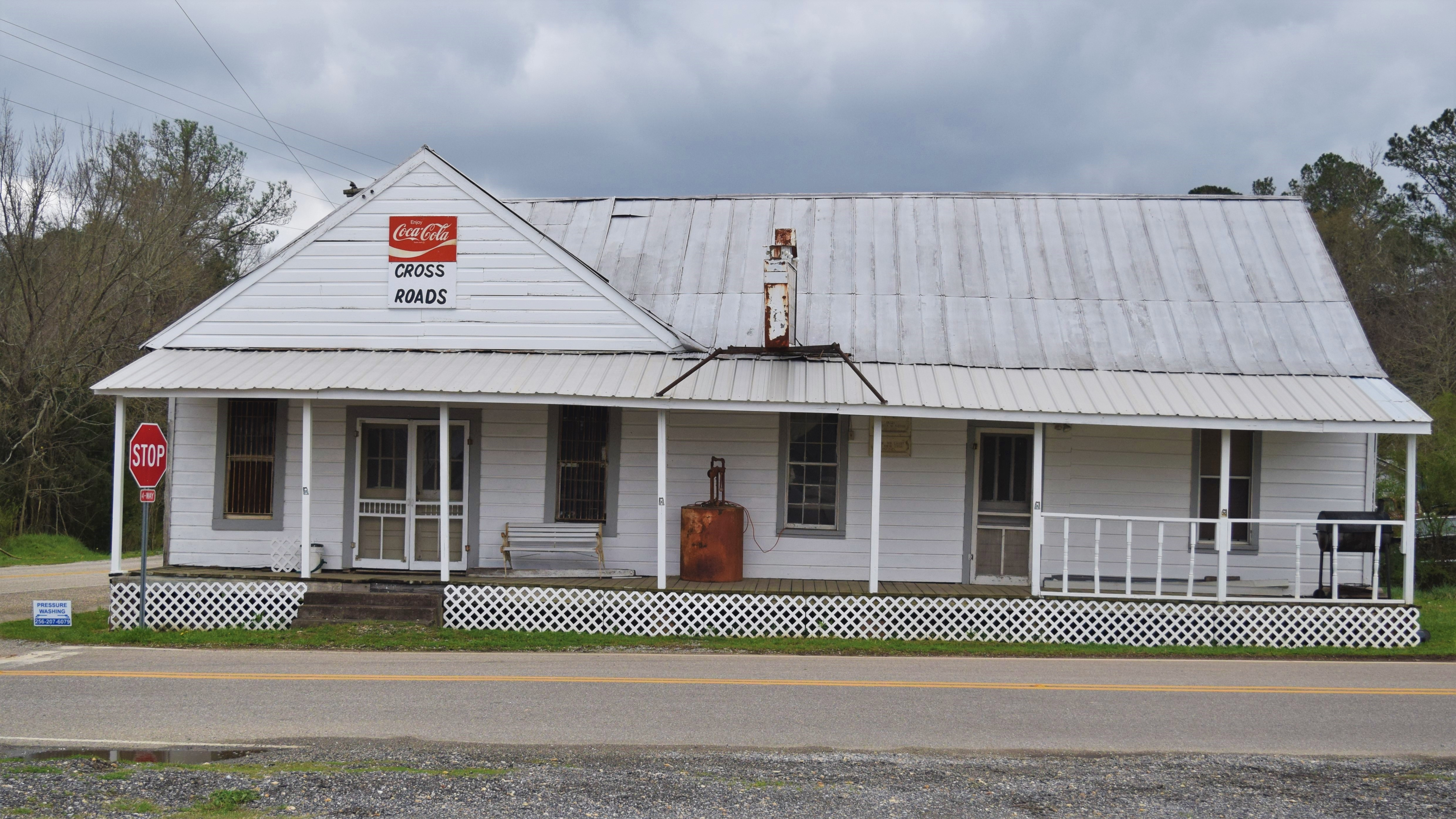
The Crossroads Store in Weogufka
