= Belvoir (Saffold Plantation) =

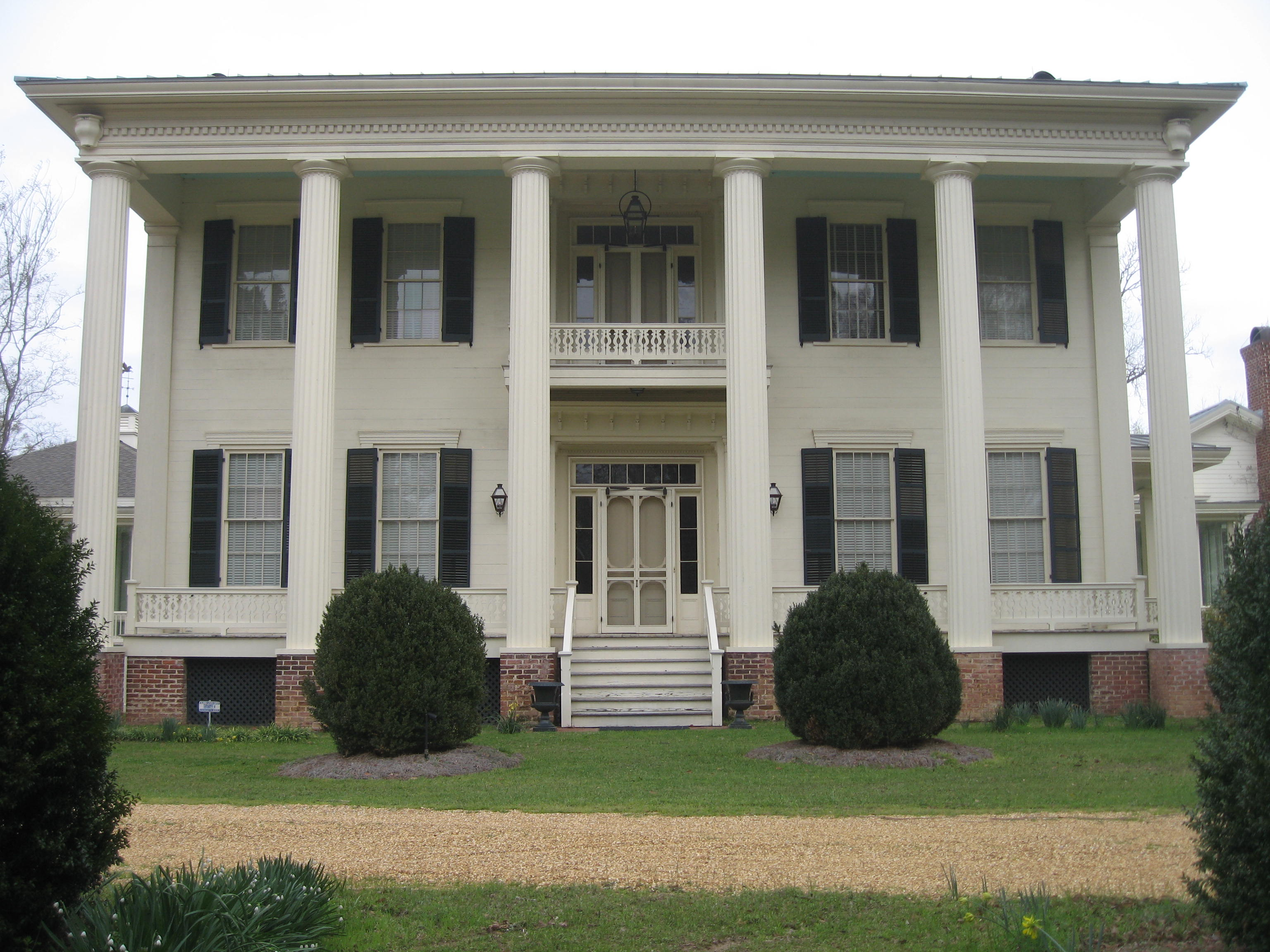
- Belvoir in March 2011

- Location within Alabama
- 32.20278°N 86.96184°W
- Location: Pleasant Hill, Alabama

History
- Founded: 1825
- Built: 1845-55

Site notes
- Architectural style: Greek Revival
- Governing body: Private

Alabama Register of Landmarks and Heritage
- Official name: Belvoir (Saffold Plantation)
- Designated: November 2, 1990

Belvoir, also known as the Saffold Plantation, is a historic plantation house built by Reuben Saffold II near Pleasant Hill, Alabama, United States. The Greek Revival-style house features a Carolina-type, hexastyle portico with Doric columns. It was added to the Alabama Register of Landmarks and Heritage on November 2, 1990.

== History ==
Belvoir was established as a large slave labored cotton farm in 1825 by Reuben Saffold II. Saffold was born on September 4, 1788, in Wilkes County, Georgia. He was educated there and began a law practice in Watkinsville, Georgia. He married Mary Evelyn Phillips of Morgan County in 1811. The couple had 12 children including Benjamin Franklin Saffold. They moved to Clarke County, Mississippi Territory, in 1813, where he participated in the Creek War in 1813–14.

Saffold served in the legislature of the Alabama Territory in 1818. He participated in the Constitutional Convention and became an Alabama circuit judge in 1819.

He established his plantation, which he named Belvoir, in rural Dallas County, Alabama in 1825. Belvoir translates roughly from French to English as "beautiful to see." He remained a circuit judge until 1832, when he was appointed to the Alabama Supreme Court. He served as Chief Justice from 1834 until 1836.

It remains unclear when the house was built. The Saffolds were still living in a large hewn log house in 1838, according to English naturalist Philip Henry Gosse, who was serving as a teacher for the Saffolds and other area children. Gosse later wrote about his experiences at Belvoir, including his negative impressions of slavery, in Letters from Alabama: Chiefly Relating to Natural History. Family records indicate that the house was built before Saffold's death on February 15, 1847. Architectural historians usually date it to the early to mid-1850s, due to stylistic elements found in its architecture.

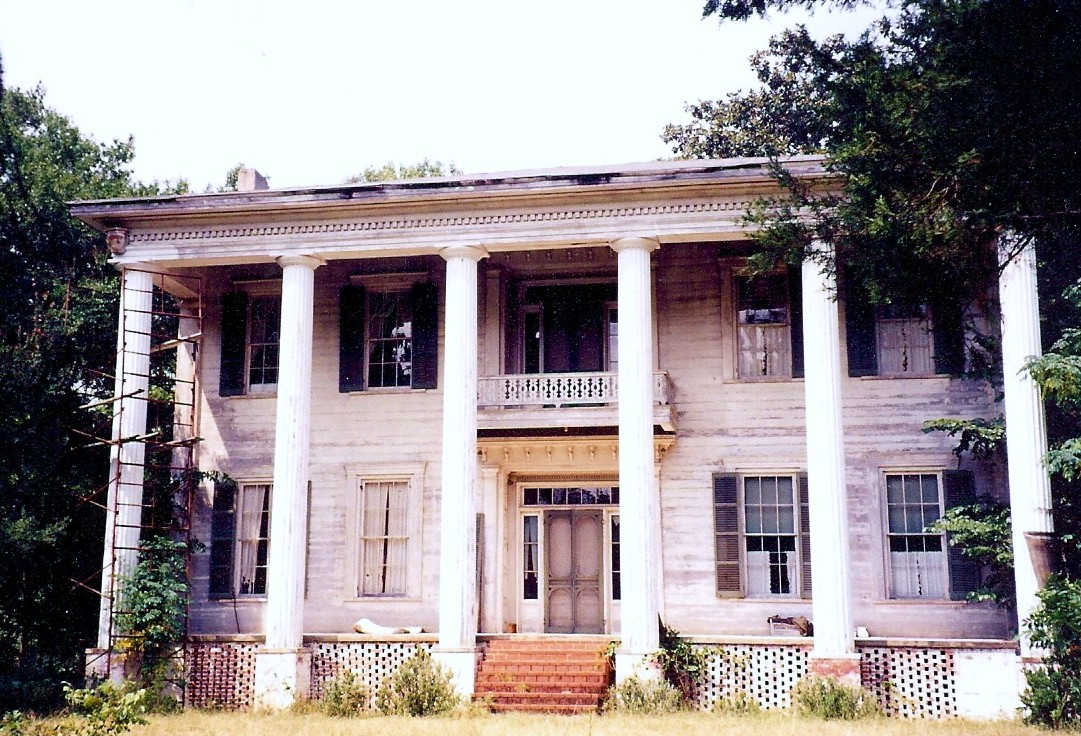
Belvoir in 1997, prior to restoration

Belvoir changed hands several times after the American Civil War. Cotton production gave way to cattle farming by the mid-20th century. The Mason family from Birmingham used it and the surrounding 500 acres (200 ha) as a hunting lodge until it was bought by the McQueen family, relatives of the Masons, for $50,000 during the 1960s. The house was in a state of disrepair by the late 1990s, when it was added as a "Place in Peril" by the Alabama Historical Commission. The McQueens declined several purchase offers from people they felt were not particularly interested in restoring the house, then sold it to the Collias family of Boston who restored the house to a good state of preservation.
