= Cullman Historic District =

Historic district in Alabama, United States

- U.S. National Register of Historic Places
- U.S. Historic district
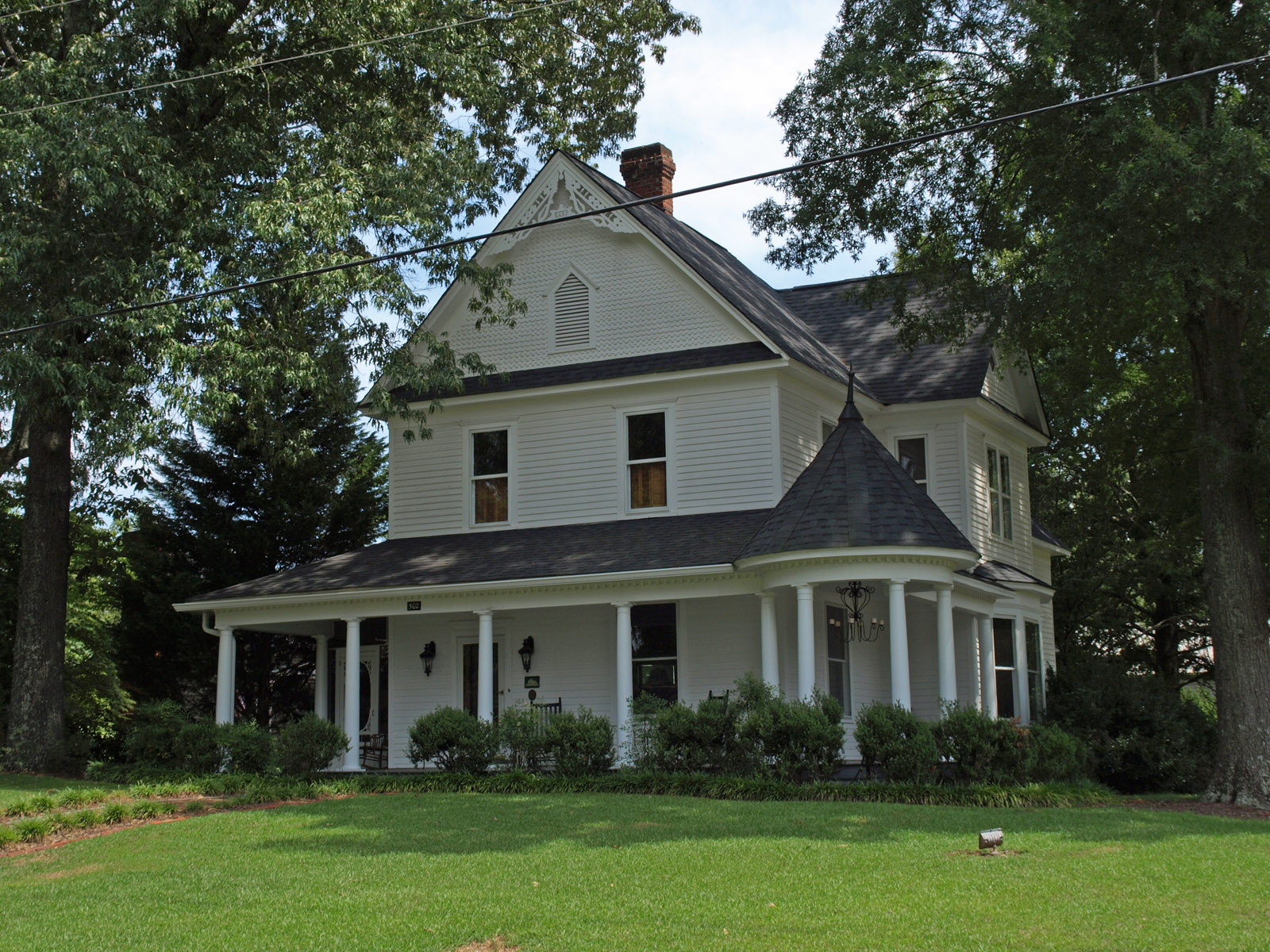
- The Rambow-Abt House in July 2012

- Location within Alabama Location within the United States
- Location: Roughly bounded by 1st and 8th Aves., 3rd and 9th Sts., Cullman, Alabama
- Coordinates: 34°10′26″N 86°49′58″W
- Area: 88.5 acres (35.8 ha)
- Built: 1874
- NRHP reference No.: 84000615
- Added to NRHP: August 30, 1984

The Cullman Historic District is a historic district in Cullman, Alabama, United States. The district covers 89 acres (36 ha) and has 77 contributing properties, which are predominantly residential buildings. The town was founded in 1873 by German merchant John G. Cullmann on land along the Louisville and Nashville Railroad line between Huntsville and Birmingham. The earliest residential development came in the form of log houses, many of which were replaced by stately Victorian and Queen Anne homes in the 1880s and 1890s. In the early 20th century, many homes with Eastlake details were constructed. Beginning in the 1920s, many bungalows were built. After the 1930s, most houses built were more spartan, however some notable Jacobethan Revival are represented. Other notable buildings in the district are the Works Progress Administration-built East Elementary School (1936) and the St. John's United Church of Christ (1924).

The district was listed on the National Register of Historic Places in 1984.
