= Asa Johnston Farmhouse =

Historic house in Alabama, United States

- U.S. National Register of Historic Places
- Alabama Register of Landmarks and Heritage
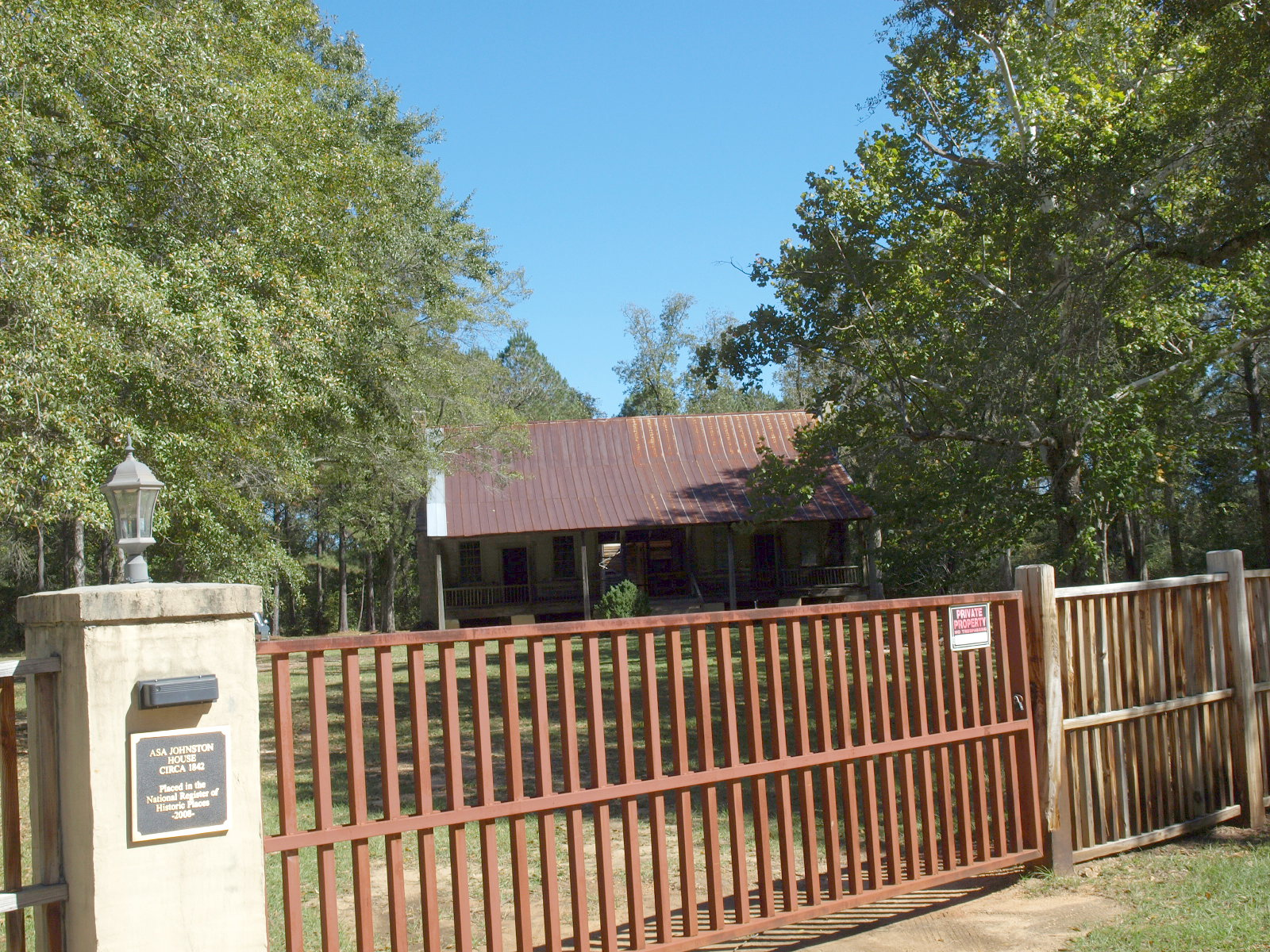

- Location within Alabama Location within the United States
- Location: Co.Rd. 29 .6 mi NW. of jct. with Co.Rd. 6, Johnsonville, Alabama
- Coordinates: 31°17′6″N 86°52′0″W
- Built: 1842
- Architect: Ezra Plumb
- Architectural style: Dogtrot, Greek Revival
- NRHP reference No.: 08000455

Significant dates
- Added to NRHP: May 21, 2008
- Designated ARLH: October 4, 1993

The Asa Johnston Farmhouse is a historic farmhouse in Johnstonville, Alabama, United States. The one-story, spraddle roof dogtrot house was built in 1842 by Ezra Plumb for Asa Johnston.

== History ==
The farmhouse is one of only a small number of surviving works by Ezra Plumb, a local carpenter, designer, and builder who became one of Conecuh County's eminent builders prior to the American Civil War. Plumb, born in Connecticut, migrated to the area around 1835. The residence was built for Asa Johnston, born in Bibb County, Georgia, on August 24, 1798. He had arrived in Conecuh by 1818, the year the county was founded, making him one of the original pioneers. He owned forty slaves by 1840. He held 960 acres (390 ha) of land and forty-seven slaves by 1850. His real estate holdings had increased to 3,450 acres (1,400 ha), valued at $10,000 by 1860. His personal property was valued at $63,500 during that year. This figure included his farm implements, livestock, and sixty-seven slaves.

== Architecture ==
The house features wood-frame construction throughout. The front facade is seven bays wide, with a central open breezeway and doors on either side, framed by two windows each. The interior displays simple vernacular Greek Revival details, such as mantles, molded window surrounds, four-panel doors and molded door surrounds. Decorative faux painted finishes are present on trim, wainscoting and doors. The central breezeway features a barrel vaulted ceiling, the only example documented in Alabama. A full-width Carolina porch stretches across the front. A semi-detached dining room, built around the same time as the main house, is connected to the rear of the house by a covered elevated walkway. It is a gable-fronted building, one bay wide with a central entrance doorway and two bays deep.

== Historic designations ==
It was added to the Alabama Register of Landmarks and Heritage on October 4, 1993, and to the National Register of Historic Places on May 21, 2008.
