= Crane Hill, Alabama =

Unincorporated community in Alabama, United States

- Unincorporated community
- Location in Alabama.
- Coordinates: 34°05′38″N 87°03′47″W
- Country: United States
- State: Alabama
- County: Cullman
- Established: 1806

Area
  - Total: 44.100 sq mi (114.219 km^{2})
- Elevation: 828 ft (252.4 m)

Population
  - Total: 2,341
- Time zone: UTC-6 (Central (CST))
  - Summer (DST): UTC-5 (CDT)
- ZIP code: 35055
- Area code: 256
- GNIS feature ID: 151747

Crane Hill is an unincorporated community in Cullman County, Alabama, United States, located in the southwestern portion of the county. The community of Crane Hill traces its history back to 1806, when the first settlers recorded their land titles. The area is named after the sandhill crane that fished the streams and roosted on a hill located just north of Mt. Zion Road.

== Overview ==
The area is nestled at the foot of the Appalachian Mountains; it offers a landscape of rock outcrops and meadows endowed with indigenous plants, wildflowers, and a variety of wild animals. Smith Lake and many freshwater streams wind through the hills and rocks, offering residents and visitors recreational opportunities.

The Crane Hill community consists of several businesses and these government buildings.

- Four volunteer fire departments
- One senior center
- One post office (35053)
- One public park (Dowling Memorial Park)

== Crane Hill School ==
- In 1904, Crane Hill Jr. High School was built and is now the Masonic Lodge, which was relocated to its present site in 1934. That same year, the school it was replaced by a brick structure and was known as Crane Hill School.
- In 1938, the school was destroyed by fire reportedly started by an electrical problem.
- In 1939, the citizens of Crane Hill built a new brick school using trees on site and a sawmill owned by Ivan Williams. Once completed, the school was named after the then-superintendent of education in Cullman County, H.G. Dowling.
- On Labor Day 1996, Dowling Junior High School was vandalized and burnt to the ground, and was never rebuilt.

== Dowling Memorial Park ==
After the fire of 1996, the citizens of Crane Hill once again try to raise money to rebuild the school, but the Cullman County Board of Education did not see a need at the time for a school at the location. In 1997, an effort to raise money led to the start the Sweet Tater Festival. This festival has moved to Smith Lake Park in recent years.

== Churches ==
- Mt. Hope Baptist Church is notably the oldest church in Crane Hill. The first church was built in 1877, the same year Cullman County came into existence. In 1923, the church was destroyed by a fire, but was rebuilt in 1962.
- Sulphur Springs Baptist Church
- Flat Rock United Methodist Church
- Livingston Chapel Church
- Beulah Church of the Nazarine
- Holy Ground Baptist Church (Formerly called the New Mt. Zion Baptist Church)

== Historic buildings ==
- Crane Hill Masonic Lodge is listed on both the Alabama Register of Landmarks and Heritage and the National Register of Historic Places.

== Additional facts ==
- County Road 222 is the main road that goes through Crane Hill.
- The crime rate in the community is very low.
- No traffic lights

== Demographics ==
- European American population: 2,467
- African American population: 0
- Native American population: 10
- Asian ancestry population: 3
- Native Hawaiian and Other Pacific Islander population: 4
- Some other race population: 1
- Two or more races population: 12
