= Loree, Alabama =

Unincorporated community in Brownsville, Alabama

- Unincorporated community
- Location within Alabama Location within the United States
- Coordinates: 31°29′15″N 87°06′33″W
- Country: United States
- State: Alabama
- County: Conecuh
- Elevation: 358 ft (109 m)
- Time zone: UTC-6 (Central (CST))
  - Summer (DST): UTC-5 (CDT)
- Area code: 251
- GNIS feature ID: 156629

Loree is an unincorporated community in Conecuh County, Alabama, United States.

== History ==
Loree was named in honor of the daughter of Archie F. Davis, who served as the first postmaster. Loree was formerly home to a school, sawmill, cotton gin, and syrup mill.

A post office operated under the name Loree from 1904 to 1909.
