= Belleville, Alabama =

Unincorporated community in Brownsville, Alabama

- Unincorporated community
- Location within Alabama Location within the United States
- Coordinates: 31°25′48″N 87°06′33″W
- Country: United States
- State: Alabama
- County: Conecuh
- Elevation: 436 ft (133 m)
- Time zone: UTC-6 (Central (CST))
  - Summer (DST): UTC-5 (CDT)
- Area code: 251
- GNIS feature ID: 113883

Belleville, also known as Bellville or The Ponds, is an unincorporated community in Conecuh County, Alabama, United States.

== History ==
Belleville was originally known as The Ponds due to a large number of ponds in the area. It was then named Belleville in honor of John Bell, who initiated a project to drain the ponds. The first settlers in Conecuh County settled in Belleville. Belleville was formerly home to multiple churches, five grist mills, three general stores, a barbershop, a lumber mill, and a hotel.

A post office operated under the name Belleville from 1828 to 1957.
