= Wesley Plattenburg House =

- U.S. National Register of Historic Places
- Alabama Register of Landmarks and Heritage
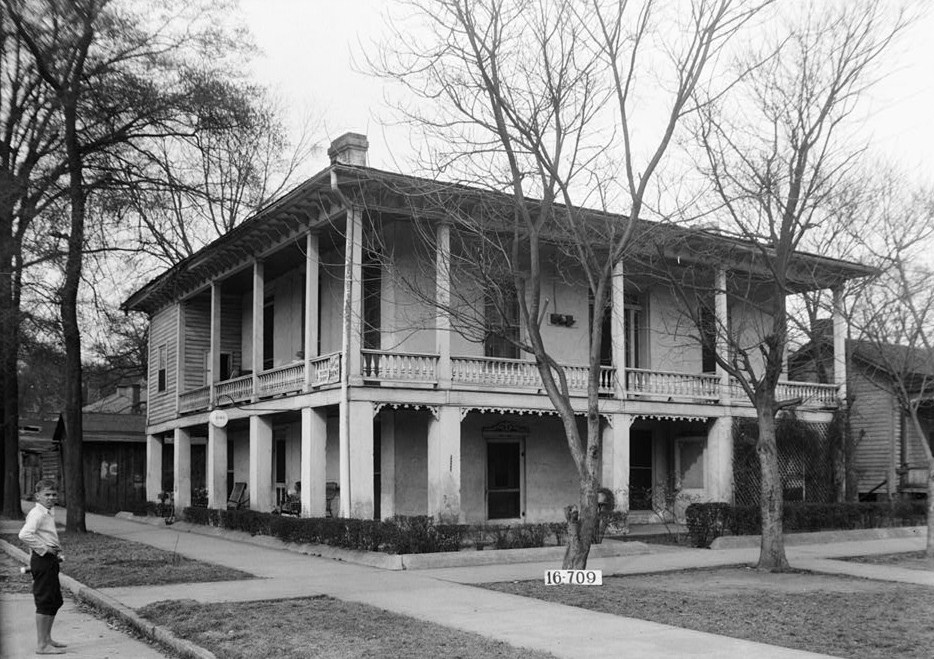
- As recorded by the Historic American Buildings Survey in 1934

- Location within Alabama Location within the United States
- Location: 601 Washington St., Selma, Alabama
- Coordinates: 32°24′50″N 87°1′20″W
- Built: 1842
- Architectural style: Greek Revival, Italianate
- NRHP reference No.: 92001827

Significant dates
- Added to NRHP: February 3, 1993
- Designated ARLH: March 22, 1991

The Wesley Plattenburg House is a historic house in Selma, Alabama, United States. Featuring a unique combination of the Greek Revival and Italianate styles, it was completed in 1842 for Wesley Plattenburg. Plattenburg was born on April 13, 1803, in Anne Arundel County, Maryland. He had relocated to Selma and had assumed the occupation of tailor by 1829. He became a successful merchant and served on the city council of Selma for many years.

The house was once at the center of a 2,200-acre (890 ha) plantation that Plattenburg inherited from a close friend, Mr. Wood, upon his death. Plattenburg took up the vocation of planter after receiving the property. The house is one of the few structures remaining in the city that is identifiable on a map of the Battle of Selma. The city eventually grew to completely encompass the site. The house was added to the Alabama Register of Landmarks and Heritage on March 22, 1991, and to the National Register of Historic Places on February 3, 1993. It was listed on Alabama's Places in Peril in 2005.
