= Crane Hill Masonic Lodge =

- U.S. National Register of Historic Places
- Alabama Register of Landmarks and Heritage
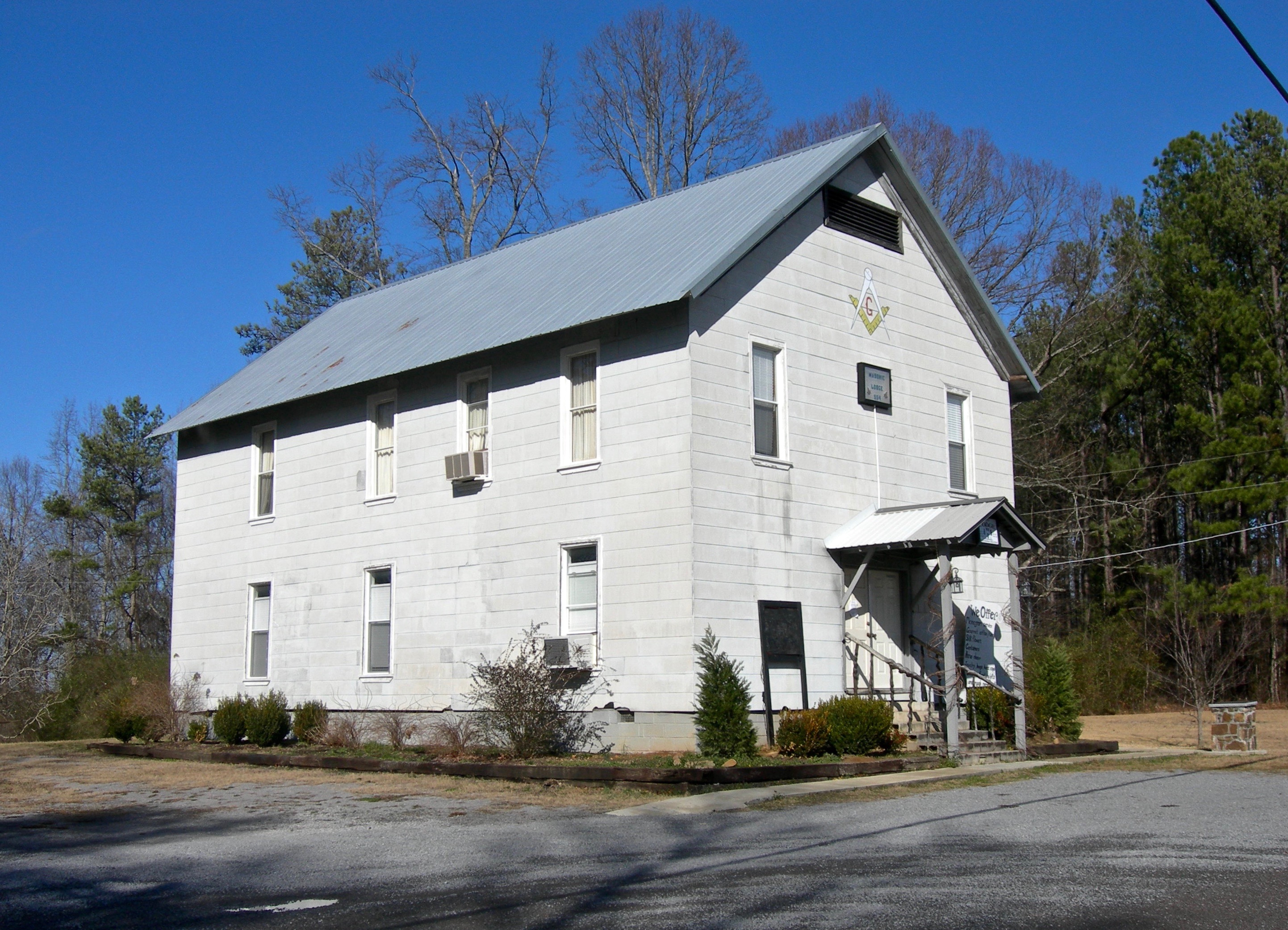
- The lodge in 2008

- Location within Alabama Location within the United States
- Location: 14538 Cty. Rd. 222, Crane Hill, Alabama
- Coordinates: 34°5′49.5″N 87°3′16.2″W
- Area: 1.7 acres (0.69 ha)
- Built: 1904
- Built by: Cooper, Philip Aquilla; Boone, Robert
- Architectural style: Masonic lodge
- NRHP reference No.: 01001294

Significant dates
- Added to NRHP: November 29, 2001
- Designated ARLH: February 25, 1999

The Crane Hill Masonic Lodge is a historical Masonic building in Crane Hill, Alabama, United States. Built in 1904, it is listed on the National Register of Historic Places.

Built as a meeting hall for Crane Hill Masonic Lodge #554, it has also housed a school.

The building is a "free standing gable front" structure. It was historically used as a meeting hall, as a school, as a multiple dwelling, and as a department store.

The building was listed on the Alabama Register of Landmarks and Heritage in February 1999. It was listed on the National Register of Historic Places in 2001. It is currently used as a Masonic hall.
