= Benjamin F. Saffold =

American judge (1826–1889)

Benjamin Franklin Saffold (1826–1889) was an American lawyer, politician and judge. He was a justice of the Supreme Court of Alabama from 1868 to 1874.

== Biography ==
Saffold was born in Pleasant Hill, Dallas County, Alabama to parents Reuben Saffold and Mary (née) Phillips Saffold. Benjamin's father had immigrated from Georgia in 1813 and had served as a frontier huntsman, lawyer and a constitutional delegate that brought Alabama into the Union. By 1835, Reuben Saffold had become the chief justice of the Alabama Supreme Court.

Benjamin Saffold graduated from the University of Alabama in 1845 and was admitted to the bar in 1847.

He was a Democrat until the party took steps to ensure secession. He fiercely campaigned against it and failed to secure a seat as a unionist. During Reconstruction after the Civil War, he served as a judge of the circuit court and Mayor of Selma. He was a delegate to the 1867 Constitutional Convention as a representative of the 16th district. In 1868, Governor William Hugh Smith appointed Saffold an associate of the Alabama Supreme Court. He served until 1874. He died at age 63 in Mobile, Alabama.
