= Logan, Alabama =

Unincorporated community in Alabama, United States

- Unincorporated community
- Location within Alabama Location within the United States
- Coordinates: 34°08′17″N 87°00′23″W
- Country: United States
- State: Alabama
- County: Cullman
- Elevation: 741 ft (226 m)
- Time zone: UTC-6 (Central (CST))
  - Summer (DST): UTC-5 (CDT)
- ZIP code: 35098
- Area codes: 256 & 938
- GNIS feature ID: 159998

Logan is an unincorporated community in Cullman County, Alabama, United States.

It is the location of the Shady Grove Methodist Church, which is listed on the National Register of Historic Places.
