= Ernest Edward Greene House =

Historic house in Alabama, United States

- U.S. National Register of Historic Places
- Alabama Register of Landmarks and Heritage
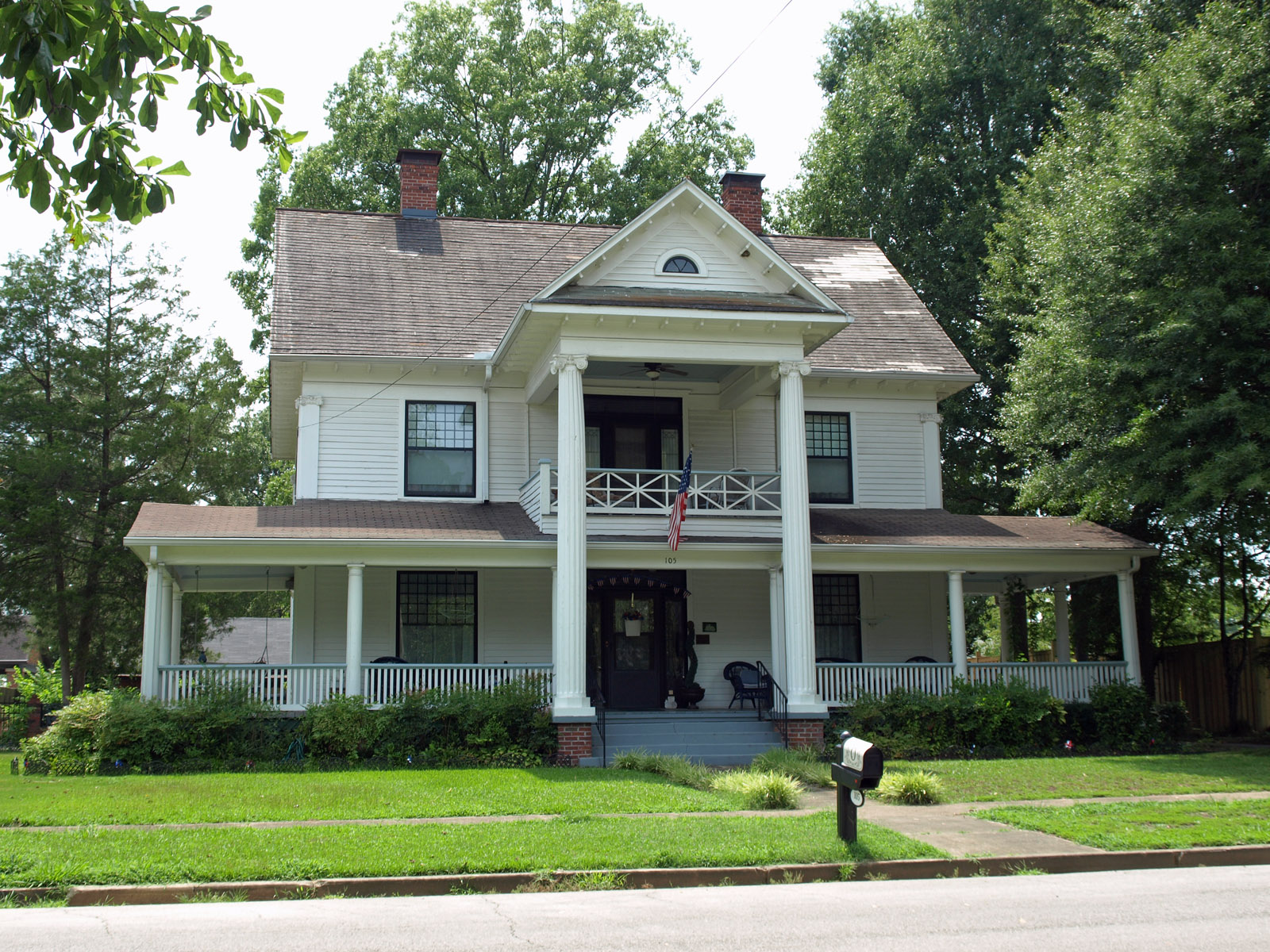
- The house in July 2012

- Location within Alabama Location within the United States
- Location: 105 6th Ave. SE., Cullman, Alabama
- Coordinates: 34°10′45″N 86°50′16″W
- Area: less than one acre
- Built: 1913
- Architectural style: Classical Revival
- NRHP reference No.: 92001828

Significant dates
- Added to NRHP: February 3, 1993
- Designated ARLH: February 20, 1986

The Ernest Edward Greene House is a historic residence in Cullman, Alabama, United States. The house was built in 1913 by Ernest Edward Greene, the superintendent of Southern Cotton Oil Company. After Greene's death in 1922, the house was passed on to several more owners, including John George Luyben, Sr., who lived in the house for 34 years.

The two-story house is built in Neoclassical style, and has a side gable roof with two interior chimneys. The three-bay façade features a double-height portico, supported by two Ionic columns. The corners of the house have matching Ionic capitaled pilasters. A one-story, hip roofed porch supported by ten Tuscan columns wraps around the front of the house and halfway down each side. The front door has one large pane of glass, as well as a transom and sidelights; a similar door leads from the second floor hall to the deck above. The door and portico are flanked on the first floor by 40-over-1 sash windows on the ground floor, while the second floor features 35-over-1 sashes; the side elevations have 25-over-1 sashes, with 20-over-1 and 10-over-1 windows on the rear. There are rounded 25-over-1 windows in the attic-level gable ends. The interior is laid out in a center-hall plan, with two rooms on either side of a main hall. A dining room, living room, kitchen, and study are on the main floor, with three bedrooms and a sitting room on the second.

The house was listed on the Alabama Register of Landmarks and Heritage in 1986 and the National Register of Historic Places in 1993.
