= Shady Grove Methodist Church and Cemetery =

Historic site in Cullman County, Alabama, US

- U.S. National Register of Historic Places
- Alabama Register of Landmarks and Heritage
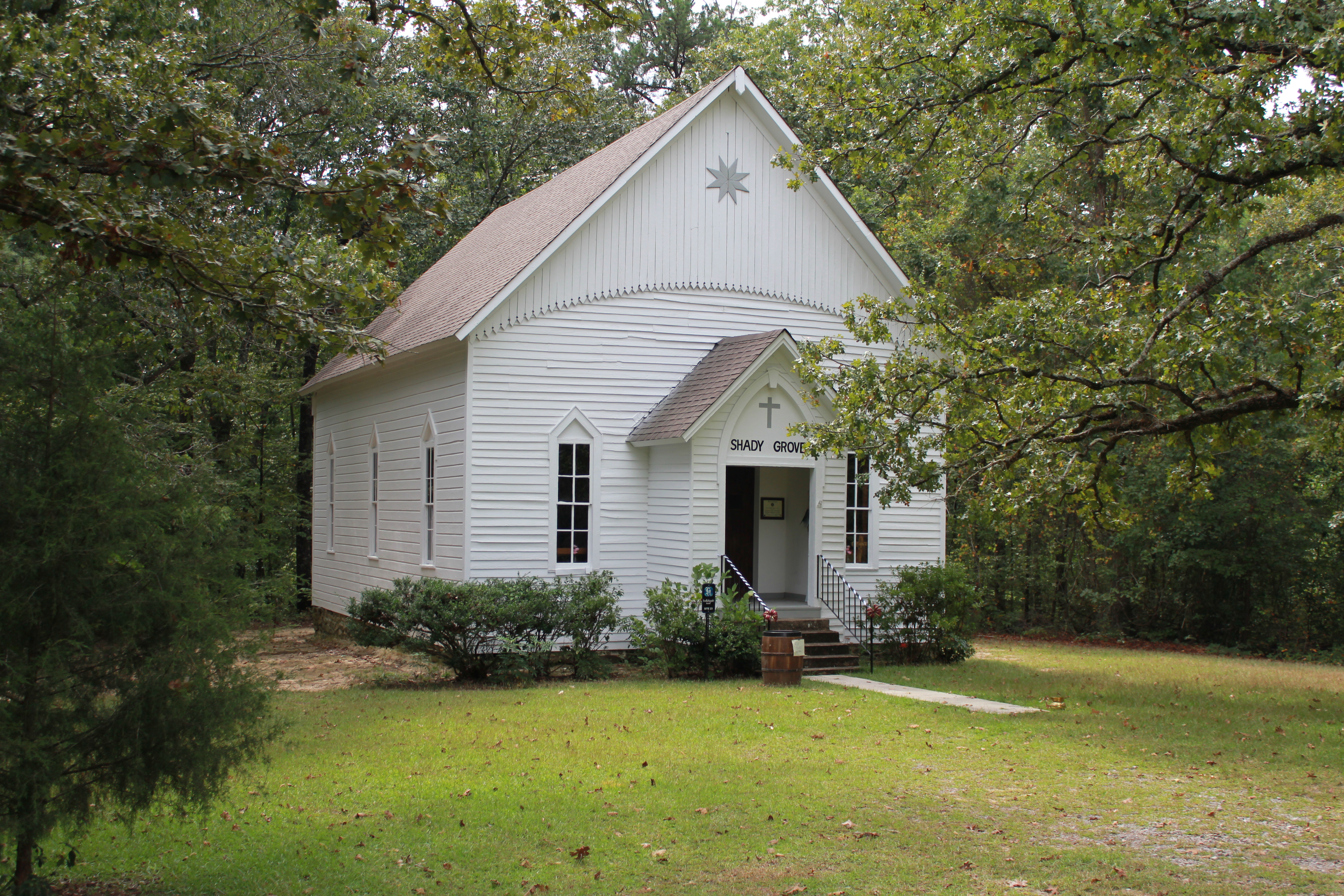

- Location within Alabama Location within the United States
- Nearest city: Logan, Alabama
- Coordinates: 34°08′29″N 87°02′05″W
- Area: 8.4 acres (3.4 ha)
- Built: 1892
- Architect: Beltz, George Conrad
- Architectural style: Gothic Revival
- NRHP reference No.: 02001067

Significant dates
- Added to NRHP: October 3, 2002
- Designated ARLH: February 25, 1999

Shady Grove Methodist Church and Cemetery is a historic church in Logan, Alabama, United States. Built in 1892, it was added to the Alabama Register of Landmarks and Heritage in 1999 and the National Register of Historic Places in 2002.
