= Reuben Saffold =

American judge (1788–1847)

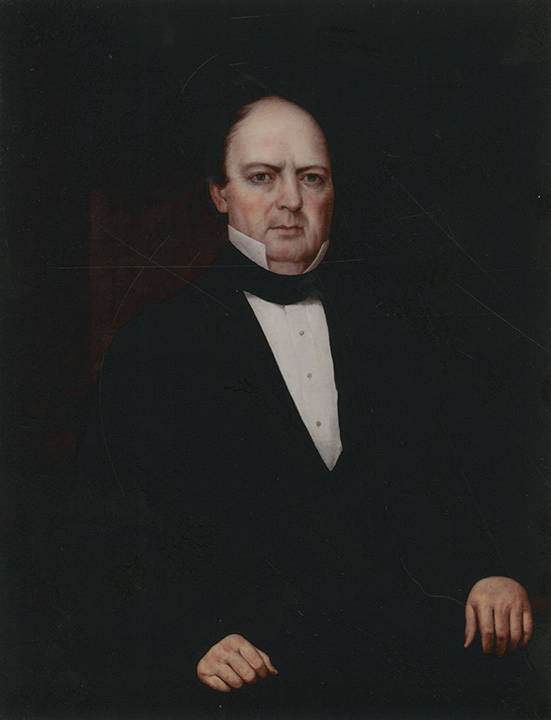
- Chief Judge Reuben Saffold

Circuit judge
- In office 1819–1820

Associate Justice of the Supreme Court of Alabama
- In office 1820–1834

Chief Justice of the Supreme Court of Alabama
- In office 1834–1836

Personal details
- Born: September 4, 1788
- Died: February 15, 1847
- Resting place: Belvoir
- Citizenship: American
- Spouse: Mary Evelyn Phillips
- Children: 12, including Benjamin Franklin Saffold
- Occupation: Lawyer; Planter

Military service
- Years of service: 1813-1814
- Battles/wars: Creek War

Reuben Saffold (September 4, 1788 – February 15, 1847) was an associate justice of the Supreme Court of Alabama from 1820 to 1834, and then Chief Justice until 1836.

Born in Wilkes County, Georgia, he was educated there and began a law practice in Watkinsville, Georgia. He married Mary Evelyn Phillips of Morgan County in 1811. The couple had 12 children including Benjamin Franklin Saffold. They moved to Clarke County, Mississippi Territory, in 1813, where he participated in the Creek War from 1813 to 1814.

Saffold served in the legislature of the Alabama Territory in 1818. He participated in the Constitutional Convention and became an Alabama circuit judge in 1819.

In 1825, he established a large slave-labor cotton plantation, which he named Belvoir, in rural Dallas County, Alabama. Belvoir translates roughly from French to English as "beautiful to see". Saffold remained a circuit judge until 1820, when he was appointed to the Alabama Supreme Court. He served as Chief Justice from 1834 until 1836.

Saffold returned to private practice in Mobile, Alabama, thereafter moving to Dallas County, Alabama. In 1843, Governor Benjamin Fitzpatrick proposed to return Saffold to the state supreme court, but Saffold chose to remain in private practice. Saffold died in Mississippi at the age of 58, and was buried at Belvoir.

Political offices
Preceded by Newly established court	Justice of the Supreme Court of Alabama; 1820–1834	Succeeded by Harry I. Thornton
Preceded by Abner Smith Lipscomb	Chief Justice of the Supreme Court of Alabama; 1834–1836	Succeeded by Henry Hitchcock
