= Stiefelmeyer's =

- U.S. National Register of Historic Places
- Alabama Register of Landmarks and Heritage
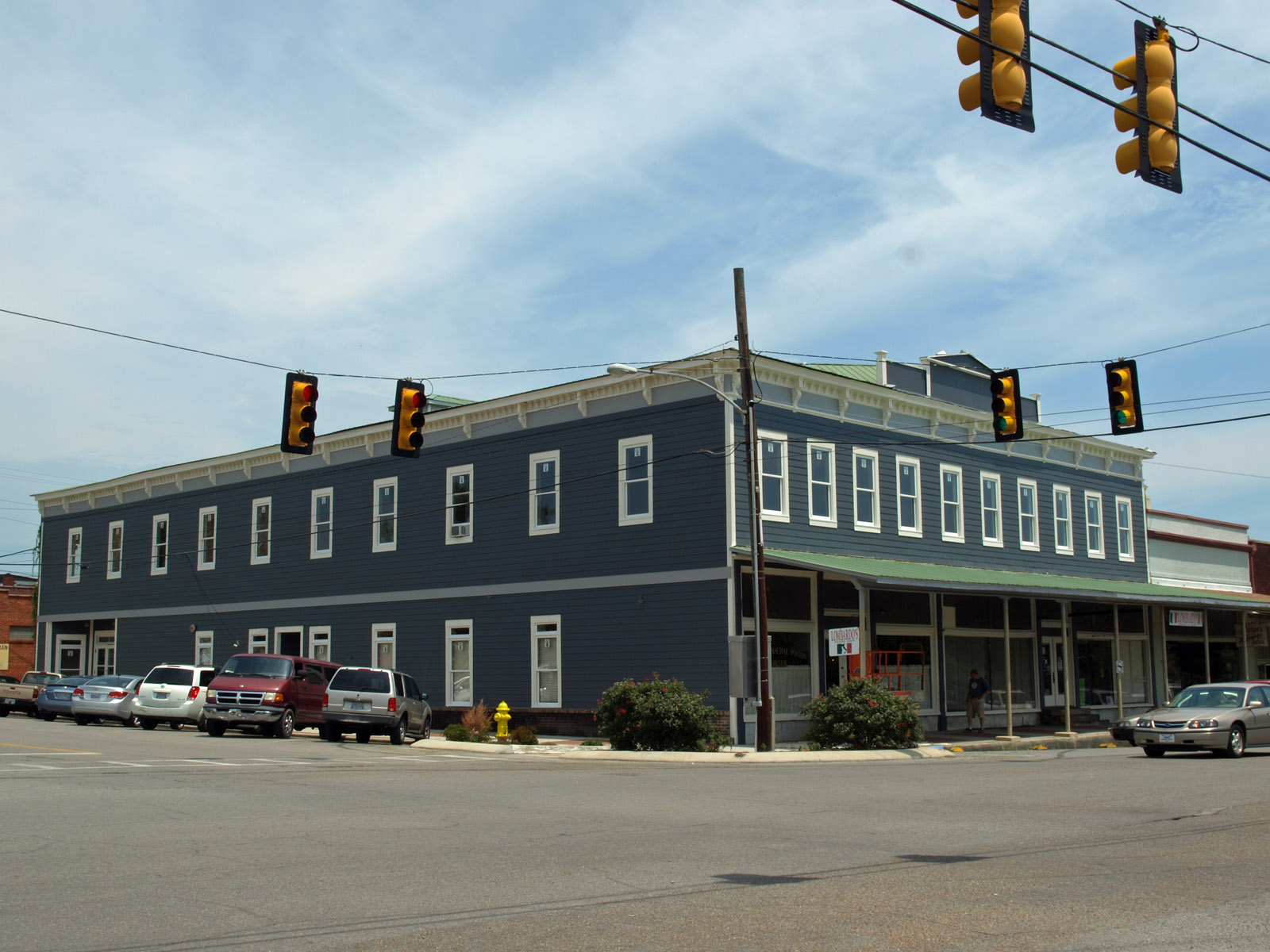
- The building in July 2012

- Location within Alabama Location within the United States
- Location: 202 1st Ave. SE, Cullman, Alabama
- Coordinates: 34°10′35″N 86°50′32″W
- Area: 0.2 acres (0.081 ha)
- Built: 1892
- Architectural style: Italianate
- NRHP reference No.: 83003444

Significant dates
- Added to NRHP: December 22, 1983
- Designated ARLH: January 19, 1978

Stiefelmeyer's was a historic commercial building in Cullman, Alabama, United States. The store was founded in 1888, and occupied a two-story frame storehouse until it was destroyed by fire in 1892. Although brick had already become the material of choice for commercial buildings in the town, the next Stiefelmeyer's was built in 1892 of wood. An addition was constructed in 1900, expanding the building's size. As other wood commercial buildings were destroyed by fire and replaced with brick structures, Stiefelmeyer's remained the only example of the once-dominant building material in Cullman's commercial district until once again being destroyed by fire on the morning of April 13, 2026.

The two-story building was designed in Italianate style. The building had a tall cornice with scroll-cut brackets and modillions. The front façade featured two sets of double-leaf doors, each flanked by large display windows resting on marble base panels. A shed roofed canopy, similar to the one installed around 1900, covered the sidewalk along the front. The first floor doors and windows were topped with prism glass transoms. Two further entrances were along the 2nd Street side, one in the middle, and a recessed entrance near the rear. Several one-over-one sash windows with small transoms also lined the side of the building. The second floor on the front and side also had rows of one-over-one windows.

The building was listed on the Alabama Register of Landmarks and Heritage in 1978 and the National Register of Historic Places in 1983.

There is also a Steifelmeyer Park in Cullman.
