= Hugh McAlister =

Hugh McAlister may refer to:

- Alice Alison Lide, American author who wrote under the pseudonym "Hugh McAlister," likely with her sister Margaret Alison Johansen and possibly on her own
- Margaret Alison Johansen, American author and Alice Alison Lide's sister who wrote under the pseudonym "Hugh McAlister," likely with Lide and possibly on her own
