= Elm Bluff =

Elm Bluff may refer to:

- Elm Bluff, Alabama
- Elm Bluff Plantation
