= A. Grace Lee Mims =

American singer and radio personality (1930–2019)

Mims at WCLV Radio

A. Grace Lee Mims (July 17, 1930 – October 3, 2019) was an African-American singer, radio personality and leading member of the arts community in Cleveland, Ohio best known for her 43 years as a radio host and producer on the classical radio station WCLV.

== Early life ==
A. Grace Lee Mims was born in Snow Hill, Alabama on July 17, 1930. Her parents were Arnold Wadsworth and Alberta Grace Edwards Lee, both of whom were musically talented. Her father played cornet and was the band director at Florida A & M University, while her mother was a classical pianist and teacher. Three of her six siblings were also musically gifted - sister Consuela Lee and brothers Bill (father of Spike Lee) and Clifton - and together they formed a jazz-folk ensemble which played at churches and schools. The group's name, The Descendants of Mike and Phoebe, commemorated two enslaved ancestors whose stories were recounted by their grandfather William James Edwards. Together they recorded an album, "A Spirit Speaks".

== Education ==
She attended the Snow Hill Institute, which was founded by her grandfather, and graduated as valedictorian. She went on to Hampton University, where she earned a BA in English with a minor in Voice. While studying at Hampton she met her future husband Howard Mims. She then earned a Master of Science degree in Library Science from Western Reserve University.

== Career ==
=== Education ===
She began her career working at libraries in Cleveland and Detroit, before becoming head librarian at Glenville High School in Cleveland, Ohio. While at Glenville, she built a highly regarded library of African-American culture. She also launched the first Afrocentric course in the Cleveland Public Schools system and created the Black Arts Festival, which attracted notable guests such as Muhammad Ali. During the period 1980–2018, she was a voice instructor at The Music School Settlement in Cleveland.

=== Music ===
For 20 years, she was a soprano soloist at the Fairmount Presbyterian Church in Cleveland Heights. She also sang with the William Appling Singers and Orchestra, who performed at Lincoln Center and the Newport Jazz Festival. She further performed with the Cleveland Orchestra Chorus and Chamber Chorus. In 1981, she recorded and produced a solo album entitled "Spirituals". She was considered a leading authority on Spiritual solo music.

=== Radio ===
In 1976 she approached Robert Conrad, the president of WCLV, with the idea of hosting a show centered around African-American classical music and jazz. Over the course of the 43 years of hosting the "Black Arts" show, she conducted extensive research to inform her profiles of artists such as Jessye Norman, Leontyne Price, Miles Davis and Duke Ellington. From 1980 she also hosted a 5-minute interview show "Artslog" which ran on WCLV for 30 years.

== Accolades ==
Mims was dedicated to the arts community, serving on the boards of the Cleveland Institute of Music, the Cleveland Museum of Art and the Black History Archives of the Western Reserve Historical Society. In 2011 she was awarded the Martha Joseph Prize for Distinguished Service to the Arts, in recognition of " living a life committed to music, family and the contributions of African Americans to culture, history and the arts".

Other awards included:

- An honorary doctorate in Music from Cleveland State University in May 1999
- Recognition at the 2007 Women of Vision Luncheon hosted by the Greater Cleveland chapter of the National Coalition of 100 Black Women.
- The Theodore J. Horvath Award, granted by the Rainey Institute in recognition of those who embody the transformative power of the arts
- Outstanding Musical Alumnus Award from Hampton University

== Death and legacy ==
In 1971, Mims was one of the founding members of the African American Archives Auxiliary of the Western Reserve Historical Society, which guides the development of its African-American Archives collection.

In 2010 she established the A. Grace Lee Mims Vocal Scholarship in cooperation with The Cleveland Foundation. The purpose of the scholarship is to "perpetuate the singing of the Negro spiritual through performance and/or teaching, so that this art form, created by African-American slaves in the Diaspora, will remain alive." She and her husband established the Cleveland chapter of the Hampton University Alumni Association, which also awards scholarships to local area students.

She died in her home on October 3, 2019, at the age of 89.
