= World Famous Crochet Museum =

Museum in California

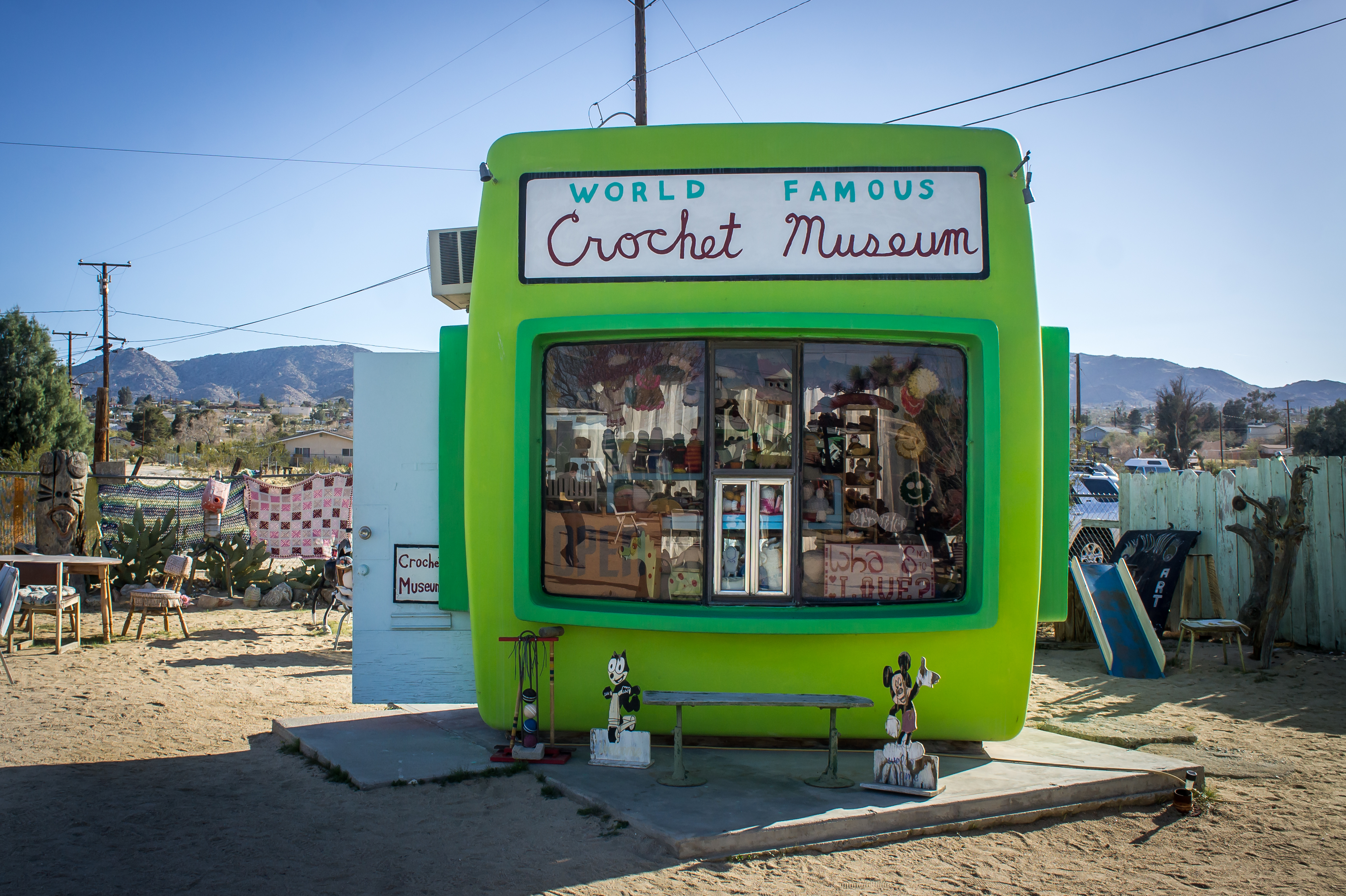
- The museum in 2018

- Location within California Location within the United States
- Established: 2006
- Location: 61855 CA-62, Joshua Tree, CA 92252
- Coordinates: 34.1343°N 116.3139°W
- Founder: Shari Elf
- Website: www.sharielf.com/museum.html

The World Famous Crochet Museum is a museum in Joshua Tree, California displaying many crocheted items collected by Shari Elf. Founded in 2006, it is a popular roadside attraction and is free to enter.

== History ==
While living in Los Angeles, Shari Elf began collecting crocheted poodles in the mid-1990s. She moved to Morongo Valley and began to work on art about a decade later. In Yucca Valley, she spotted an old one-hour photo hut made of fiberglass and wanted to buy it. Elf repainted it in an acid green color and added shelves for her crochet collection, which had grown considerably and was in storage at the time. Elf claims that she does not know how to crochet, and just enjoys collecting them. The museum was opened in 2006.

In 2011, a strong windstorm knocked the building to its side and dispersed parts of the collection around the area. Only small parts of the collection were lost, under 5%, and the building was barely damaged.
