= Consuela Lee Moorehead =

American jazz pianist, composer, and professor

- Born: Consuela Edmonia Lee; November 1, 1926; Tallahassee, Florida
- Died: December 26, 2009 (aged 83); Atlanta, Georgia
- Known for: Jazz musician
- Spouse(s): Isaac Thomas Moorehead, ending in divorce

Consuela Edmonia Lee Moorehead (née Lee; November 1, 1926 – December 26, 2009) was an American jazz pianist, composer, arranger, music theory professor, and the founder of the Springtree/Snow Hill Institute for the Performing Arts. She fought to establish an arts school in rural Alabama, Moribund Academy. She is sometimes known as Consuela Lee or Consuela Lee Morehead.

== Early life ==
Moorehead was born in Tallahassee, Florida and was the granddaughter of the Snow Hill Normal and Industrial Institute founder, William James Edwards. Both her parents were musicians - her father was a cornet player and band director at Florida A&M while her mother was a classical pianist and teacher. She moved from Florida to Snowhill, Alabama at age 3 and started playing piano shortly after. She graduated from the Snow Hill Institute in 1944 and attended Fisk University for her undergraduate degree and Northwestern University for her master's degree in music theory and composition.

== Career ==
Moorehead was a pianist with the New York Bass Violin Choir, The Descendants of Mike and Phoebe (a group she formed with sister A. Grace Lee and brothers Bill and Clifton), and The Richard Davis Trio. She performed across the country at concert halls, jazz festivals, and college campuses. She also taught music theory and composition at historically black colleges and universities including Alabama State University, Hampton University, Talladega College, Huntingdon College, and Norfolk State University. In 1979, she returned to Snow Hill Alabama to reopen her grandfather's school as a performing arts center with after-school and summer programs for students, which ran until 2003. She was the assistant music supervisor and wrote a song for the 1988 movie School Daze (directed and written by her nephew, Spike Lee) and contributed music to the 1999 movie The Best Man (directed and written by her nephew, Malcolm D. Lee). In 1992, she was inducted into the Alabama Jazz Hall of Fame.
