= Myshkin (singer) =

American singer-songwriter

- Born: Indiana, United States
- Genres: Folk
- Occupations: Singer-songwriter, composer, producer
- Instruments: Guitar; mandolin
- Website: www.myshkinwarbler.com

Myshkin is an American singer-songwriter, touring and recording artist, composer and producer. She sings and plays acoustic and electric guitar, tenor guitar, mandolin and other instruments solo, in cooperation with other artists, and with her band.

== Early life ==
Myshkin adopted her stage name in honor of the central character "Prince Myshkin", of Fyodor Dostoevsky's novel The Idiot.

She is a native of Indiana where she was born to parents recently immigrated from the Netherlands. After studying theater in college she moved to New Mexico, and then spent some time traveling the U.S. before settling in New Orleans, Louisiana, in 1993.

== Career ==
The artist adopted the stage name Myshkin, honoring "Prince Myshkin", the central character of Fyodor Dostoevsky's novel The Idiot.

In New Orleans she recorded five albums of her own work, and appeared on many others. She was a member of The Road Dog Diva's, Ez Bake Organs, and the Mike West Band. Myshkin and Mike West toured as a duo for a decade, playing approximately 300 shows a year throughout the U.S., Europe, Canada and Australia, and were recipients of several of the city's music industry awards.

In 2001 Myshkin formed a new band, Myshkin's Ruby Warblers, with John Lutz on upright bass and Scott Magee on drums. The first record, Rosebud Bullets, was a well received farewell to New Orleans for Myshkin, garnering spots on the 2003 best records top ten lists of The Village Voice and The Times-Picayune/The New Orleans Advocate.

Myshkin moved to Portland, Oregon. in 2002, followed by drummer Magee a year later. In Portland she began working with the electronic musician / producer Sailor Banks, with whom she released two albums Corvidae and Sigh Semaphore, concentrating on political and humanist themes.

Myshkin's Ruby Warblers continued to tour the US and Europe until 2008, when Myshkin left the city to co-found a permaculture community in Southern Oregon. There she built an earth walled studio, in which she recorded That Diamond Lust released in 2012.

In 2013, Myshkin met her future wife while on tour, and moved to Joshua Tree, California to join her. She records and performs under the name Myshkin Warbler, typically with a five-piece band, including Damian Lester on upright bass and Jenny Qaqundah on cello . In 2016, she created Myshkin Warbler's Royal Rabble Circus, which quickly became a staple of the twice-annual Joshua Tree Music Festival.

In June 2018, DoubleSalt Works released the record Trust and the High Wire, Myshkin Warbler's record about her wife's near death experience and recovery. The record serves as a musical companion to Jenny Q's experimental book, Held Together. The couple combined the two works into a performance piece, which first toured in summer 2018 as Trust.Together.

As of 2026, Myshkin lives and works in the Highlands of Scotland, where she and Jenny Q moved to in 2023.

== Discography ==
- 2026 (forthcoming): Hot Night in Paris
- 2025 Choice Blooms (compilation from previous albums)
- 2018: Trust and the High Wire
- 2012: That Diamond Lust
- 2006: Sigh Semaphore
- 2004: Corvidae, an anti-war record
- 2002: Rosebud Bullets
- 1999: Why do all the country girls leave?
- 1998: Blue Gold
- 1995: Myshkin Impossible – "Dr. Plague and Other Lullabies"
- 1996: Mike West and Myshkin – "Econoline"
- 1993: Slate
- Everythings in Boxes (with the Road Dog Divas)
- Pony (with the Road Dog Divas)

== Awards ==
- Econoline was named Offbeat Folk/Country album of the year 1997.
- New Orleans Big Easy Award – best folk / world music artist – finalist 2003, 2001, 1999
- Rosebud Bullets made the Times Picayunne and Village Voice's 10 best records of the year lists, 2002
