= Alice Alison Lide =

American writer

- Born: Alice Alison; February 8, 1890; Richmond, Alabama, U.S.
- Died: November 21, 1955 (aged 65)
- Occupation: Writer
- Spouse: Thomas Evan Lide
- Relatives: Margaret Alison Johansen (sister)
- Writing career
- Genre: Children's Literature
- Notable work: Ood-le-uk the Wanderer
- Notable awards: Newbery Medal; 1930

Alice Alison Lide (1890–1955) was an American author of children's books. She received a 1930 Newbery Honor for her book Ood-le-uk the Wanderer.

== Biography ==
Alice Alison was born in Richmond, Alabama on February 8, 1890 to Joseph D. and Annie Hearst Alison. She had at least one sibling, Margaret Alison Johansen, with whom she sometimes wrote. She attended Converse College and Columbia University.

Alison eventually married Thomas Evan Lide and added his last name to hers. The couple lived in Selma and Carlowville, Alabama.

Lide died November 21, 1955.

== Bibliography ==
- Ood-le-uk the Wanderer. Boston; Little, 1930.
- Aztec Drums. New York; Longman Green, 1938.
- Yinka-Tu the Yak. New York; Viking, 1938.
- Princess of Yucatan. New York; Longman Green, 1939.
- Johnny of the 4-H Club. Boston; Little, 1941.
- Mystery of the Mahteb, a Tale of Thirteenth-Century Ethiopia. New York; Longman Green, 1942.
- Little Indian Ongo. Richmond, Va.; Johnson Pub. Co., 1948.
- Lapland Drum. Nashville; Abingdon, 1955.
- Magic Word for Elin. Nashville; Abingdon, 1958.
- The Wooden Locket. Viking Press, 1953.
