= Waverley Turner Carmichael =

American poet

Waverley Turner Carmichael (1881 - 1936) was an African-American writer. He was born in Snow Hill, Alabama. During the First World War he served with 92nd Infantry Division of the United States Army in France. After the war he worked as a clerk with the United States Postal Service in Boston.

A collection of his poetry was published as From the heart of a folk in 1918. His works are included in several anthologies of African-American verse. His verses were written in "Negro dialect".

William James Edwards identifies him as an alumnus of Snow Hill Normal and Industrial Institute in his memoir Twenty-Five Years in the Black Belt.

A critic compared the young poet unfavorably to the level of refinement in Paul Laurence Dunbar's work.

He studied with James Holly Hanford who wrote an introduction to Carmichael's book of verse.

== Bibliography ==
- From The Heart Of A Folk: A Book Of Songs: by Waverley Turner Carmichael, Cornhill Press (1918)
