= Snow Hill Normal and Industrial Institute =

- U.S. National Register of Historic Places
- U.S. Historic district
- Alabama Register of Landmarks and Heritage
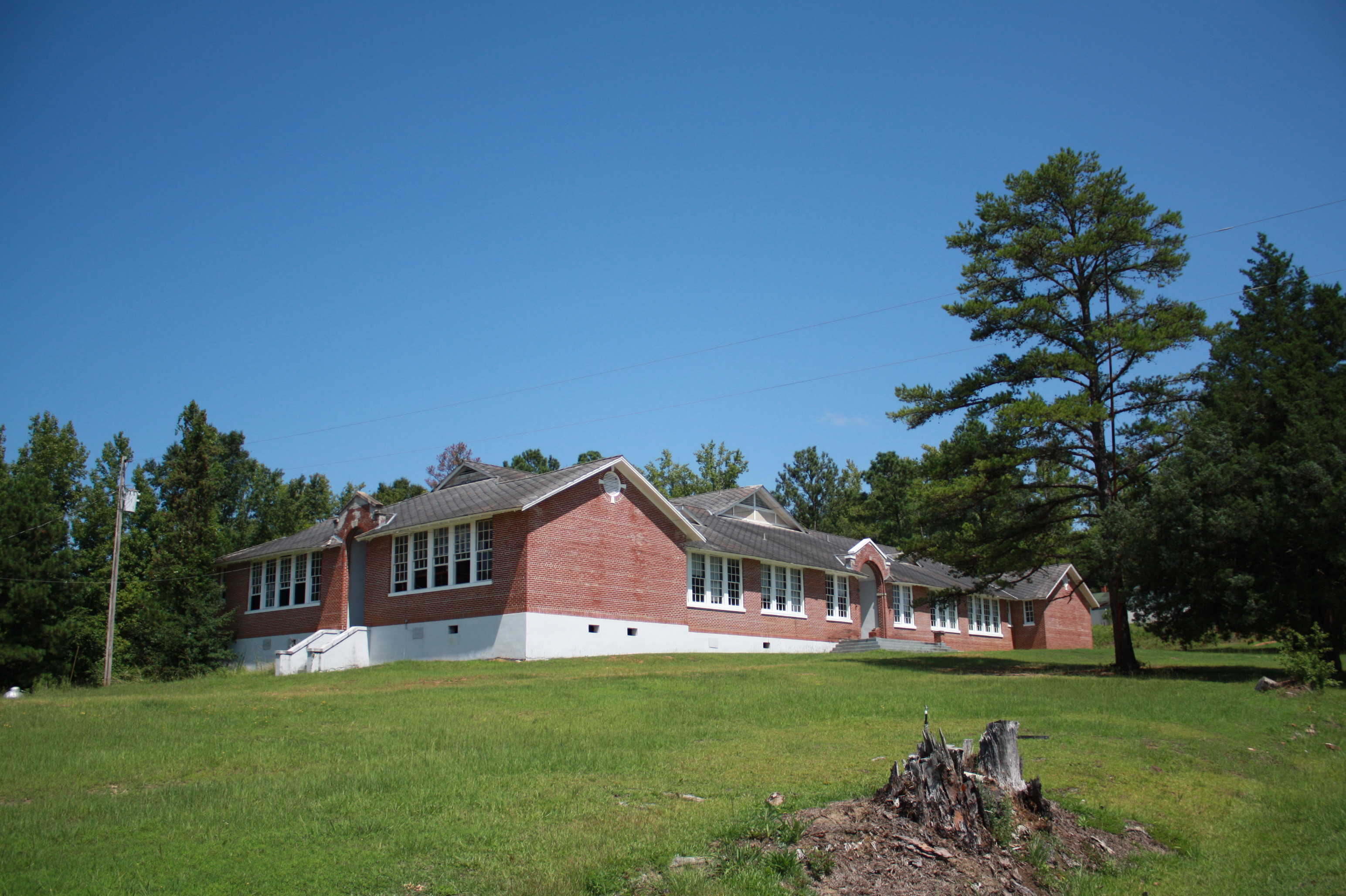

- Location within Alabama Location within the United States
- Nearest city: Snow Hill, Alabama
- Coordinates: 32°1′14″N 87°1′59″W
- Architectural style: Bungalow/Craftsman, Queen Anne
- NRHP reference No.: 95000146

Significant dates
- Added to NRHP: February 24, 1995
- Designated ARLH: July 14, 1981

The Snow Hill Normal and Industrial Institute, also known as the Colored Industrial and Literary Institute of Snow Hill, was a historic African American school in Snow Hill, Alabama. It was founded in 1893 by Dr. William James Edwards, a graduate of Tuskegee University, and began in a one-room log cabin. The school grew over time to include a campus of 27 buildings, a staff of 35, and over 400 students. The school was operated as a private school for African-American children until Dr. Edward's retirement in 1924, when it became a public school operated by the State of Alabama. The school closed in 1973, after the desegregation of the Wilcox County school system. Out of the original 27 buildings, only eight survive today. They range in architectural style from Queen Anne to Craftsman and include the founder's home, five teachers' cottages, and the library. The National Snow Hill Alumni Association and the local Snow Hill Institute supporters determined to save the remaining structures in 1980. In June 1980, Dr. Edwards' granddaughter and Snow Hill alumna Consuela Lee Moorehead reopened the school as the Springtree/Snow Hill Institute for the Performing Arts and ran after-school and summer programs for local students. The art institute continued to run until 2003 when Moorehead's declining health caused her to close down the school. The school was listed on the National Register of Historic Places on February 24, 1995.

== William James Edwards ==
The school's founder, William James Edwards (born 1869) is buried by the school. He authored Twenty-Five Years in the Black Belt about his experiences. In the book, Edwards identifies as alumni of the school:

- Emmanuel McDuffie, founder and principal of Lauringburg Normal and Industrial Institute in Laurinburg, North Carolina
- Rev. Emmanuel M. Brown, a faculty member at Street Manual Training School in Richmond, Alabama
- John W. Brister who established a prize at Snow Hill Institute
- Waverley Turner Carmichael the "Poet of Snow Hill".
