= James Holly Hanford =

American professor and author

James Holly Hanford (1882–1969) was a professor and author known for his scholarship on John Milton. He taught at Harvard University, Case Western Reserve University, University of North Carolina at Chapel Hill, Princeton, and Kenyon. His students included Waverley Turner Carmichael, Paul Green and C. A. Patrides. The Milton Society of America awards the James Holly Hanford Award in his name. He wrote A Milton Handbook. Princeton University has a collection of his correspondence mostly related to his research of Milton.

He received a Phd from Harvard in 1909.

He contributed to the Cyclopedia Americana. He co-authored The teaching of literature.

He married Hellen Margaret Ellwanger in 1909 and they had three children: Margaret E., Barbara E., and Grace E.

A Milton Evening in Honor of James Holly Hanford was published in 1948.

He wrote about his experiences at Chapel Hill.

== Bibliography ==
- A Milton Handbook
- John Milton, Englishman
- The Nelson handbook of English
- A Restoration Reader
- The chronology of Milton's private studies, Modern Language Association of America, 1921
- The Arrangement & Dates of Milton's Sonnets
