= Phillip Carl Jablonski =

American serial killer (1946–2019)

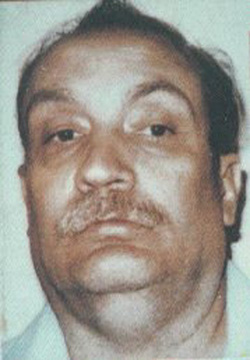
- Born: January 3, 1946; Joshua Tree, California, U.S.
- Died: December 27, 2019 (aged 73); San Quentin State Prison, San Quentin, California, U.S.
- Spouse: Alice McGowan (divorced)
- Children: 2
- Convictions: First degree murder with special circumstances (2 counts); Second degree murder
- Penalty: Death

Details
- Victims: 5
- Span of crimes: 1978–1991
- Country: United States
- States: California, Utah
- Date apprehended: April 28, 1991
- Imprisoned at: San Quentin State Prison

Phillip Carl Jablonski (January 3, 1946 – December 27, 2019) was an American serial killer and rapist convicted of killing five women in California and Utah between 1978 and 1991.

== Early life ==
Jablonski's alcoholic father beat and sexually abused his wife and children.

Jablonski met his first wife, Alice McGowan, in high school. He enlisted in the Army in 1966. It is unclear whether he served in Vietnam but he often said he did and the Vietnam Service Medal was listed on his discharge papers. They married in 1968 when he returned to the United States. While living in Texas, Jablonski became sexually violent. During sex he put a pillow over McGowan's face and attempted to suffocate her. On several occasions, he strangled her until she was unconscious.

After McGowan left him, Jablonski became involved with Jane Sanders, who he met in November 1968. He raped Sanders on their first date, which she did not report. She became pregnant and they moved to California in July 1969, after Jablonski left the military. On one occasion, while having sex, Sanders wanted to stop. Jablonski pulled out a gun and threatened to shoot her if she did not continue. He hit her with the butt of the gun and she passed out. When she regained consciousness, he was raping her. She left him in 1972.

== Criminal convictions ==
In late 1972, Jablonski raped a female acquaintance at knifepoint in her home, while her infant child was in the room. The woman escaped and ran to a neighbor's house, who called the police. Jablonski was arrested and convicted for the rape.

In February 1977, Jablonski met Linda Kimball. By August they were living together in Palm Springs. Kimball gave birth to their daughter in December 1977.

On the evening of July 6, 1978, Kimball's mother Isobel Pahls, who lived nearby, was awakened by Jablonski. He told her he had come to rape her but did not go through with it because when he looked at her face "all he could see was Linda's face." Pahls managed to escape to a neighbor's house and did not report the incident to police. A few days after the incident, Kimball left Jablonski and she and their daughter moved in with Pahls.

On the morning of July 16, 1978, Kimball returned to the apartment she had shared with Jablonski to pick up belongings for their baby. That afternoon she was found dead inside the apartment. She had been beaten, stabbed, and strangled. Jablonski was arrested 11 days later.

He served 12 years in prison for Kimball's murder; he was released on parole for good behavior in 1990, although in 1985 he had attempted to strangle his mother using a shoelace.

Carol Spadoni met and married Jablonski in 1982, after answering a newspaper ad placed while Jablonski was serving time in prison. On April 23, 1991, Spadoni, 46, and her mother, Eva Petersen, 72, were murdered at their home in Burlingame. Spadoni was shot, suffocated with duct tape, then stabbed, while Petersen was shot and then sexually assaulted.

Jablonski was charged with the April 22, 1991, death of Fathyma Vann, 38, in Indio, California. Vann was a fellow student at the local community college that Jablonski attended to satisfy conditions of his parole. Vann, a recently widowed mother of two teenage girls, was found shot in the head and sexually assaulted, lying naked in a shallow ditch in the Indio desert with the words "I Love Jesus" carved in her back. Her body had been subjected to other mutilations including removal of her eyes and ears.

On April 25, 1991, he stopped at a rest stop in Uinta County, Wyoming and brandished a gun at Yvette Shelby. She was able to escape when he dropped the gun. She drove to the next truck stop and called police. Police questioned him about the incident but claimed that the gun had accidentally fallen out of his car as he was getting out. The officer who questioned him accepted his explanation and let him go.

Jablonski was also charged with the robbery and subsequent murder of Margie Rogers, 58, in Grand County, Utah, on April 27, 1991; she and her husband owned a store on Interstate 70, where her body was found. Rogers had been sexually assaulted and shot twice in the head.

He was apprehended on April 28, 1991, in Kansas. He was found guilty of the murders and sentenced to death.

In January 2006, the California Supreme Court upheld Jablonski's death sentence on appeal.

== Death ==
Jablonski died on December 27, 2019, of "unknown causes" at the age of 73 in San Quentin State Prison in his cell.

== In popular culture ==
=== Documentary ===
- Devil Among Us - Murder Diaries (Episode 5)
- Phillip Jablonski- Unknown Serial Killers of America (Season 2, Episode 5)<ref>{{Cite web|title=‘The Unknown Serial Killers of America: Phillip Jablonski’ :

Release Date, plot, cast, trailer and all you need to know about the ID documentary, Lesser-known but equally lethal killers are revealed through interviews with police and victims' contacts, showing how these murderers stayed undetected while continuing their deadly sprees|access-date=2025-05-28|

== See all ==
- List of serial killers in the United States
