= Joshua Tree, California =

- Census-designated place
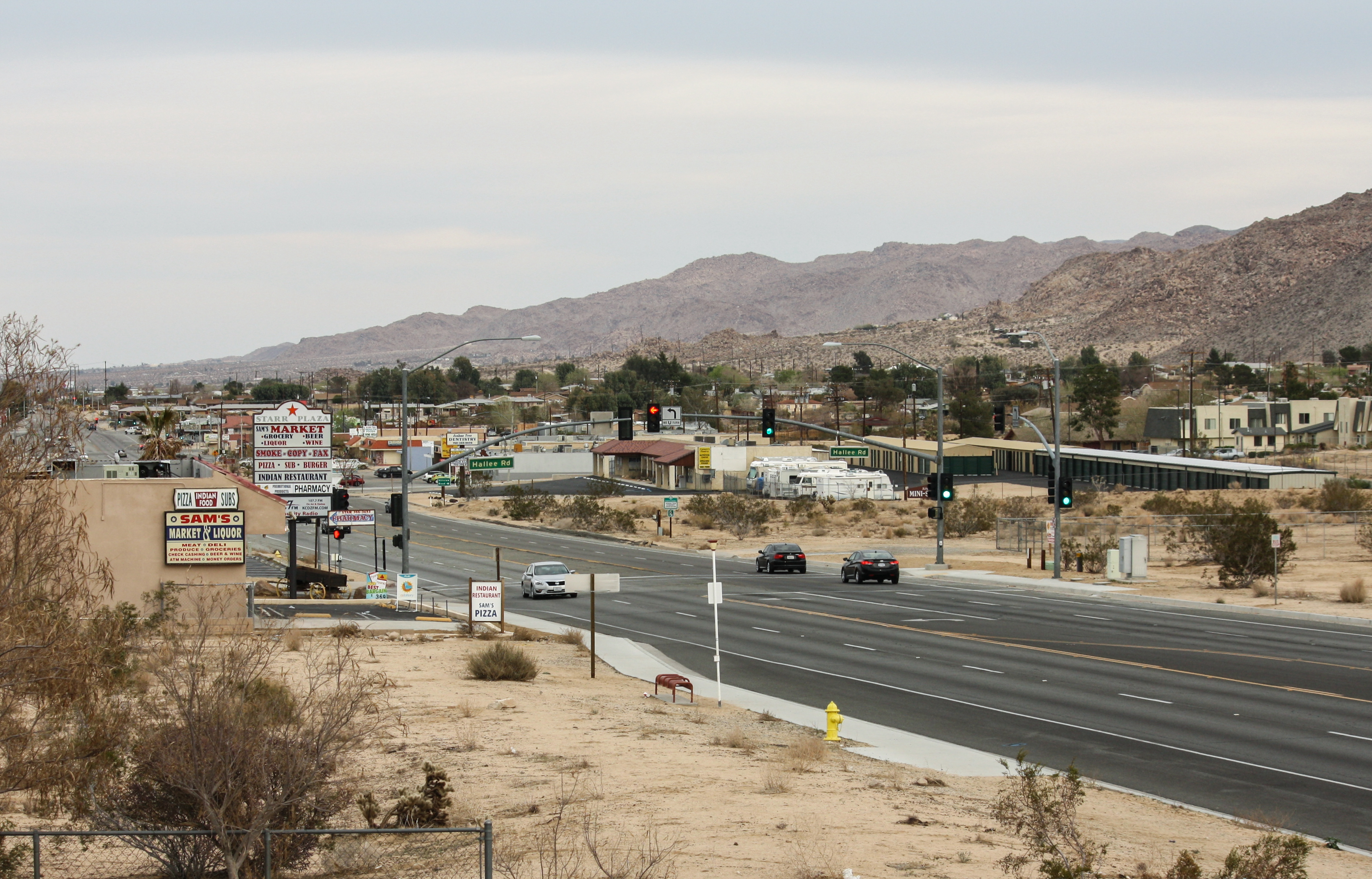
- Central Joshua Tree in 2013

- Location in San Bernardino County and the state of California

- Location in the United States
- Coordinates: 34°08′05″N 116°18′42″W
- Country: United States
- State: California
- County: San Bernardino

Area
  - Total: 36.086 sq mi (93.462 km^{2})
  - Land: 36.086 sq mi (93.462 km^{2})
  - Water: 0 sq mi (0 km^{2}) 0%
- Elevation: 2,923 ft (891 m)

Population (2020)
  - Total: 6,489
  - Density: 179.8/sq mi (69.43/km^{2})
- Time zone: UTC−08:00 (PST)
  - Summer (DST): UTC−07:00 (PDT)
- ZIP Code: 92252
- Area codes: 442/760
- FIPS code: 06-37554
- GNIS feature ID: 2408454

Joshua Tree is a census-designated place (CDP) in San Bernardino County, California, United States. The population was 6,489 at the 2020 census. At approximately 2,700 feet (820 meters) above sea level, Joshua Tree and its surrounding communities are located in the High Desert of California. The center of the business district in Joshua Tree is on California State Route 62.

== Geography ==
Joshua Tree is located in the Mojave Desert.

According to the United States Census Bureau, the CDP has a total land area of 93.5 km^{2} (36.1 mi^{2}).

Joshua Tree is home to Joshua Tree National Park. Joshua Tree shares its eastern border with Twentynine Palms, its western border with Yucca Valley, and its northwestern border with Landers; it is bordered on the south by the Coachella Valley. The Bartlett Mountains are northwest of the community.

== Demographics ==
Historical population
Census	Pop.	Note	%±
1970	1,211		—
1980	2,083		72.0%
1990	3,898		87.1%
2000	4,207		7.9%
2010	7,414		76.2%
2020	6,489		−12.5%
U.S. Decennial Census; 1850–1870 1880-1890; 1900 1910 1920; 1930 1940 1950; 1960 1970 1980; 1990 2000 2010

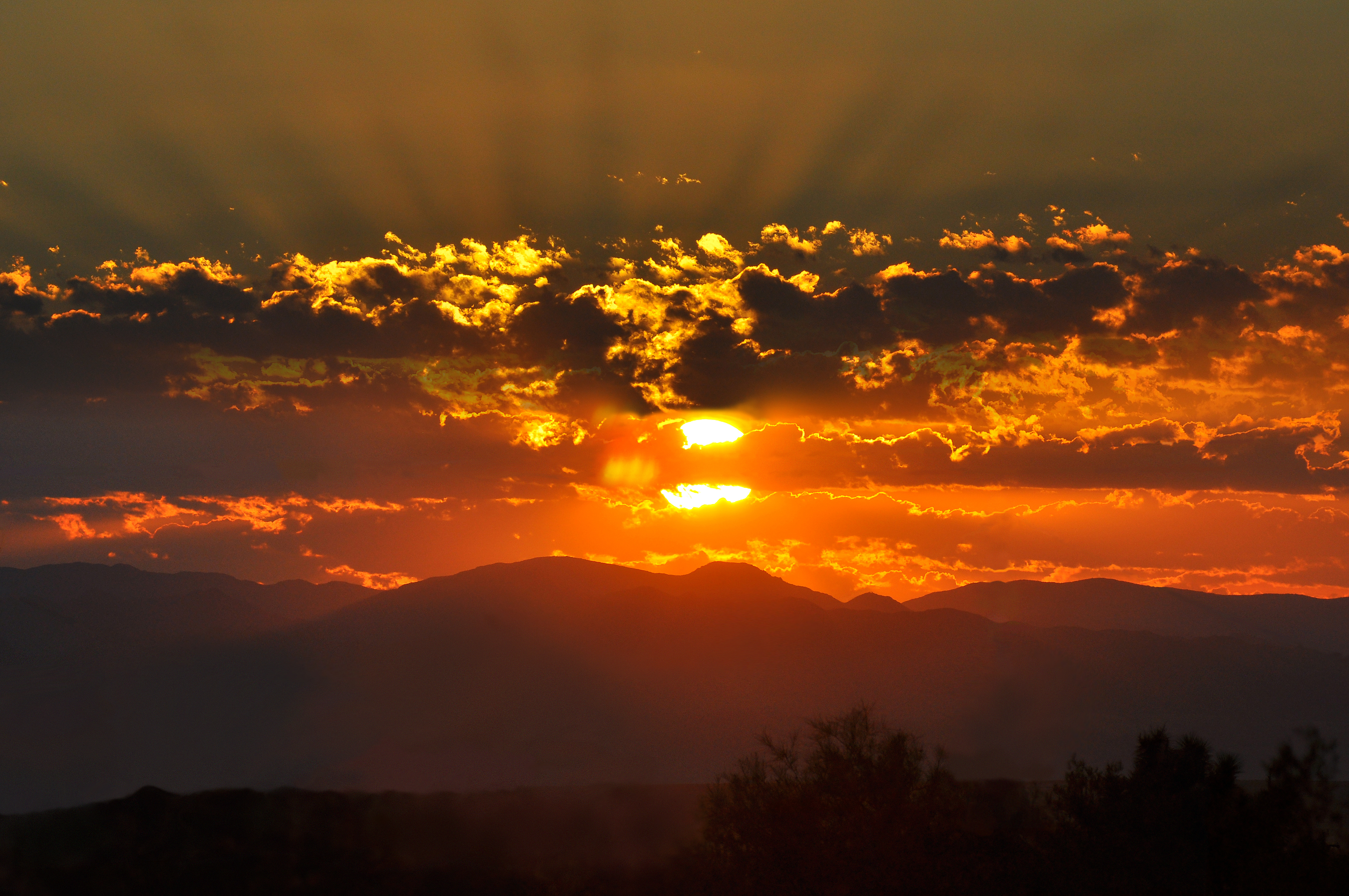
A sunrise in Joshua Tree, for which the town is well known.

Joshua Tree was first listed as an unincorporated place in the 1970 U.S. census; and then as a census designated place in the 1980 U.S. census.

=== 2020 census ===
As of the 2020 census, Joshua Tree had a population of 6,489 and a population density of 179.8 inhabitants per square mile (69.4/km^{2}). The median age was 45.1 years. 18.6% of residents were under the age of 18, 6.0% were aged 18 to 24, 25.3% were aged 25 to 44, 27.2% were aged 45 to 64, and 22.9% were 65 years of age or older. For every 100 females, there were 93.8 males, and for every 100 females age 18 and over, there were 91.0 males age 18 and over. The census reported that 96.9% of the population lived in households, 0.6% lived in non-institutionalized group quarters, and 2.5% were institutionalized. 67.3% of residents lived in urban areas, while 32.7% lived in rural areas.

There were 2,783 households in Joshua Tree, of which 21.7% had children under the age of 18 living in them. Of all households, 34.9% were married-couple households, 10.0% were cohabiting-couple households, 23.9% were households with a male householder and no spouse or partner present, and 31.2% were households with a female householder and no spouse or partner present. About 35.9% of all households were made up of individuals, and 15.7% had someone living alone who was 65 years of age or older. The average household size was 2.26, and there were 1,515 families (54.4% of all households).

There were 3,745 housing units, of which 25.7% were vacant. The homeowner vacancy rate was 3.7% and the rental vacancy rate was 8.0%. Of the 2,783 occupied housing units (74.3%), 60.4% were owner-occupied and 39.6% were occupied by renters.

Racial composition as of the 2020 census
Race	Number	Percent
White	4,685	72.2%
Black or African American	222	3.4%
American Indian and Alaska Native	99	1.5%
Asian	136	2.1%
Native Hawaiian and Other Pacific Islander	19	0.3%
Some other race	462	7.1%
Two or more races	866	13.3%
Hispanic or Latino (of any race)	1,296	20.0%

=== Demographic estimates ===
In 2023, the US Census Bureau estimated that 7.6% of the population were foreign-born. Of all people aged 5 or older, 88.5% spoke only English at home, 8.2% spoke Spanish, 2.3% spoke other Indo-European languages, 0.5% spoke Asian or Pacific Islander languages, and 0.6% spoke other languages. Of those aged 25 or older, 91.9% were high school graduates and 25.0% had a bachelor's degree.

=== Income and poverty ===
The median household income in 2023 was $64,036, and the per capita income was $33,512. About 14.6% of families and 22.6% of the population were below the poverty line.

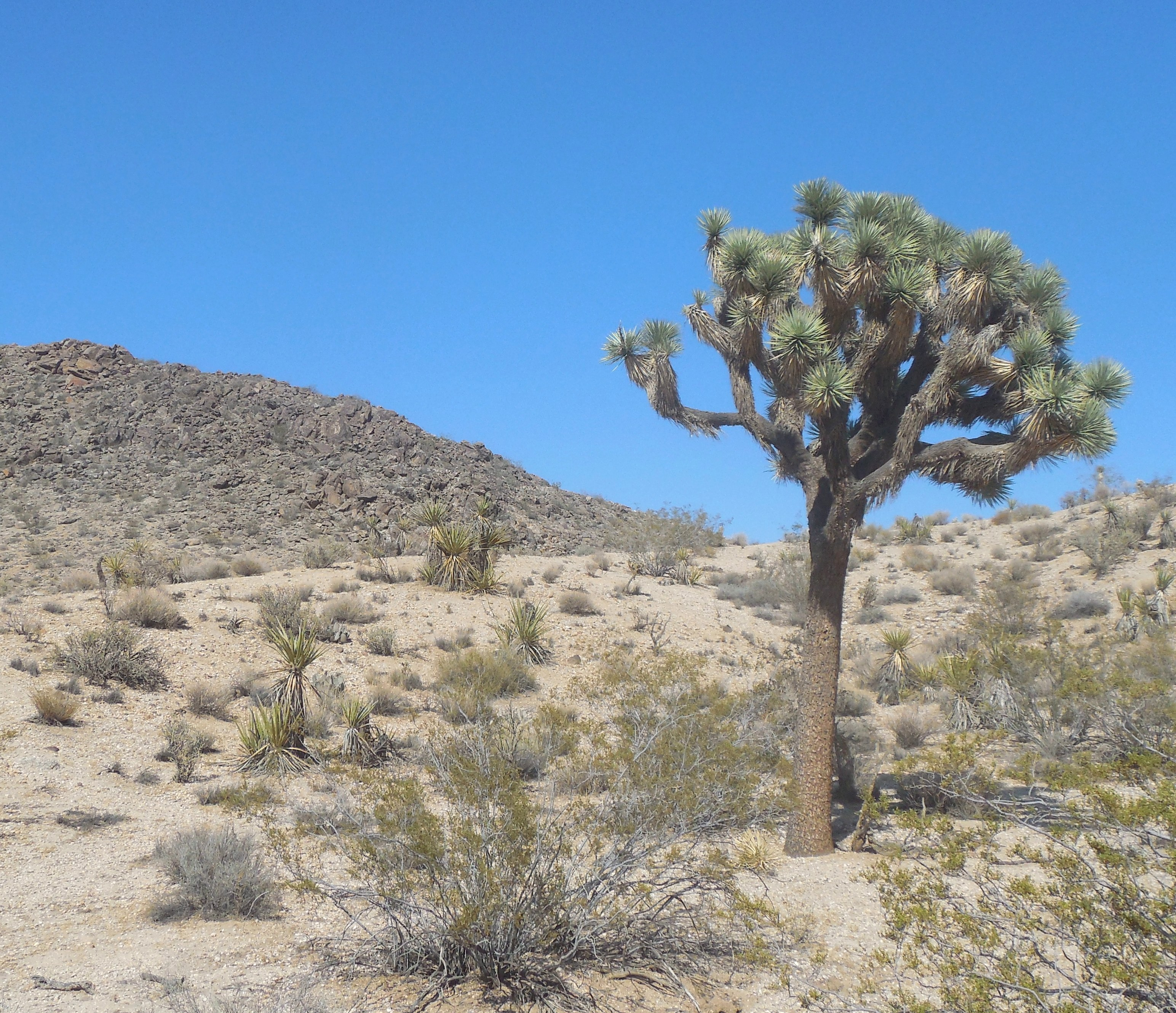
Wilderness near the Bartlett Mountains. The community's namesake, the western Joshua Tree (Yucca brevifolia) on October 9, 2020 became a candidate species under the California Endangered Species Act; the first plant species granted such protection due to the impacts of climate change.

=== 2010 census ===
At the 2010 census Joshua Tree had a population of 7,414. The population density was 200.1 inhabitants per square mile (77.3/km^{2}). The racial makeup of Joshua Tree was 6,176 (83.3%) White (73.9% Non-Hispanic White), 234 (3.2%) African American, 84 (1.1%) Native American, 104 (1.4%) Asian, 18 (0.2%) Pacific Islander, 368 (5.0%) from other races, and 430 (5.8%) from two or more races. Hispanic or Latino of any race were 1,308 persons (17.6%).

The census reported that 7,263 people (98.0% of the population) lived in households, 30 (0.4%) lived in non-institutionalized group quarters, and 121 (1.6%) were institutionalized.

There were 3,088 households, 862 (27.9%) had children under the age of 18 living in them, 1,209 (39.2%) were opposite-sex married couples living together, 431 (14.0%) had a female householder with no husband present, and 162 (5.2%) had a male householder with no wife present. There were 237 (7.7%) unmarried opposite-sex partnerships, and 30 (1.0%) same-sex married couples or partnerships. 1,018 households (33.0%) were one person and 358 (11.6%) had someone living alone who was 65 or older. The average household size was 2.35. There were 1,802 families (58.4% of households); the average family size was 2.97.

The age distribution was 1,626 people (21.9%) under the age of 18, 813 people (11.0%) aged 18 to 24, 1,756 people (23.7%) aged 25 to 44, 2,056 people (27.7%) aged 45 to 64, and 1,163 people (15.7%) who were 65 or older. The median age was 38.8 years. For every 100 females, there were 96.9 males. For every 100 females age 18 and over, there were 94.3 males.

There were 3,808 housing units at an average density of 102.8 per square mile, of the occupied units 1,872 (60.6%) were owner-occupied and 1,216 (39.4%) were rented. The homeowner vacancy rate was 3.9%; the rental vacancy rate was 9.8%. 4,178 people (56.4% of the population) lived in owner-occupied housing units and 3,085 people (41.6%) lived in rental housing units.

According to the 2010 United States Census, Joshua Tree had a median household income of $39,492, with 21.8% of the population living below the federal poverty line.

== Government ==
In the California State Legislature, Joshua Tree is in the 19th senatorial district, represented by Republican Rosilicie Ochoa Bogh, and in the 47th Assembly district, represented by Republican Greg Wallis.

In the United States House of Representatives, Joshua Tree is located in California's 23rd congressional district, which has a Cook PVI of R+10 and is represented by Republican Jay Obernolte.

Joshua Tree is represented by San Bernardino County 3rd District Supervisor Dawn Rowe.

== Attractions ==
The Joshua Tree Visitor Center for Joshua Tree National Park is located at the junction of Highway 62 and Park Boulevard in downtown Joshua Tree and the park's west entrance is located 5 mi (8.0 km) south. The community of Joshua Tree is unincorporated and is represented by the Joshua Tree Municipal Advisory Counsel (MAC) as the official liaison between the community and the San Bernardino County government.

Noah Purifoy Desert Art Museum of Assemblage Art is 10 acres (4.0 ha) of sculptures, assemblages, and installations mostly made from found material by Noah Purifoy. The World Famous Crochet Museum is also located in the area.

== Wildlife ==
The Joshua Tree National Park is home to a diverse range of wildlife, featuring 57 types of mammals, including elusive bighorn sheep and common coyotes, alongside 46 reptile species, like the increasingly rare desert tortoise. The park is also a key spot on the Pacific Flyway, recording over 250 bird species, making it a hotspot for birdwatching, from common ravens to migrating warblers. Within the city of Joshua Tree itself, animals like cottontail rabbits, coyotes, roadrunners and quails can be frequently seen.

== Notable people ==
=== Natives ===
People born in Joshua Tree:

- Brent Bolthouse, entrepreneur
- Josh Homme (born 1973), musician
- Phillip Carl Jablonski (1946–2019), serial killer

=== Inhabitants ===
People who live/lived in Joshua Tree:

- Alma Allen (born 1970), sculptor
- Tara Beier, singer
- Less Bells, musician
- Marjorie Cameron (1922–1995), actress
- Joey Castillo (born 1966), musician
- Dave Catching (born 1961), musician
- Edie Fake (born 1980), artist
- Lou Harrison (1917–2003), composer
- Conrad Lambert, musician known as "Merz"
- Cate Le Bon, musician and artist
- Myshkin, singer
- Johnette Napolitano, musician and artist
- Simon Rex (born 1974), actor
- Wayne Static (1965–2014), musician
- John Whooley, musician
- Charles M. Wysocki (1928–2002), painter
- Pati Yang, musician and artist

=== Deaths ===
People who died in Joshua Tree:

- Charles H. Gray (1921–2008), actor
- Ish Kabibble (1908–1994), comedian
- Art Kunkin (1928–2019), journalist
- John F. Logan (1946–2013), musician known as "Juke"
- Gram Parsons (1946–1973), musician
- Noah Purifoy (1917–2004), artist
- Tera Wray (1982–2016), pornographic actress

== Gallery ==
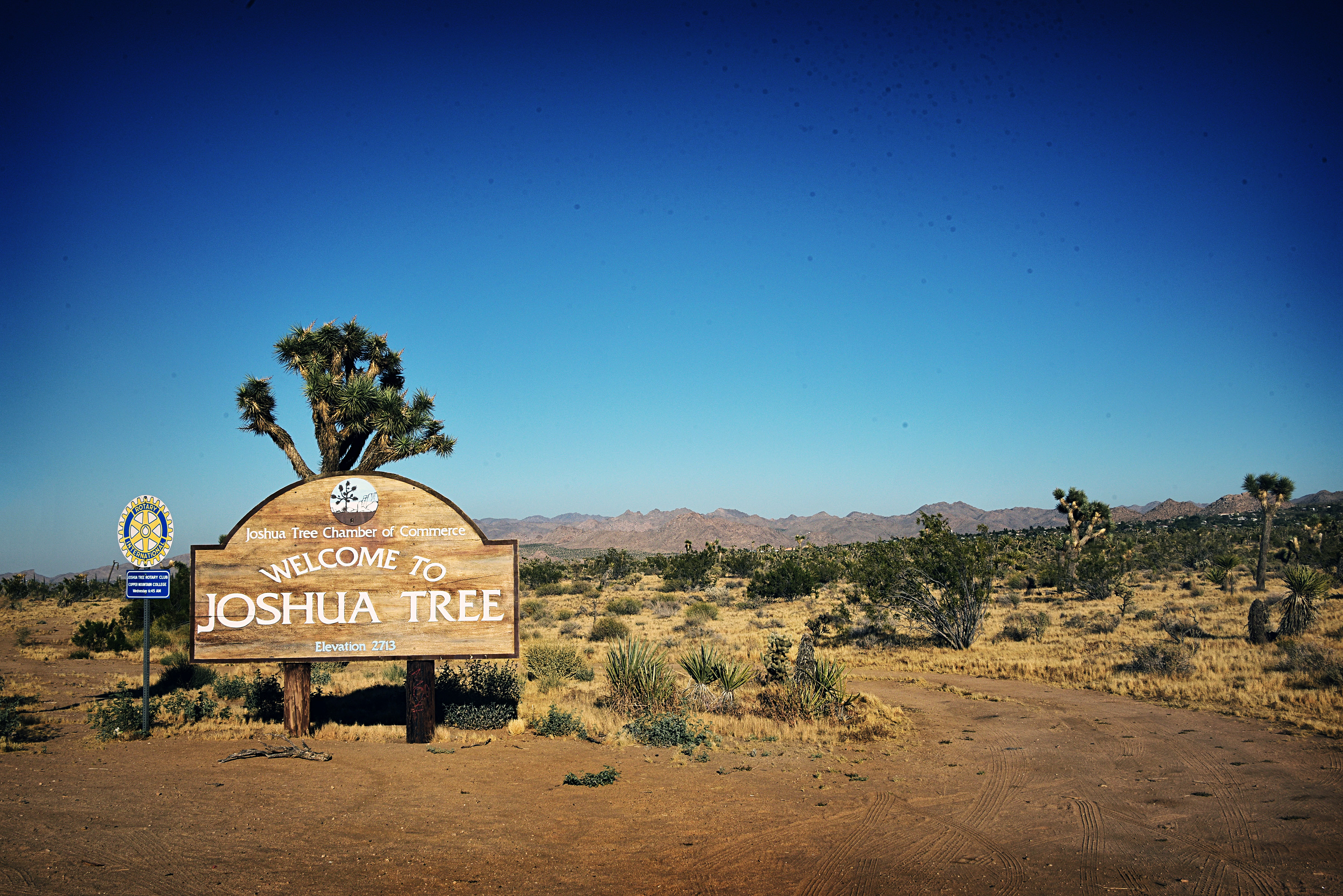
Joshua Tree Welcome sign off Highway 62

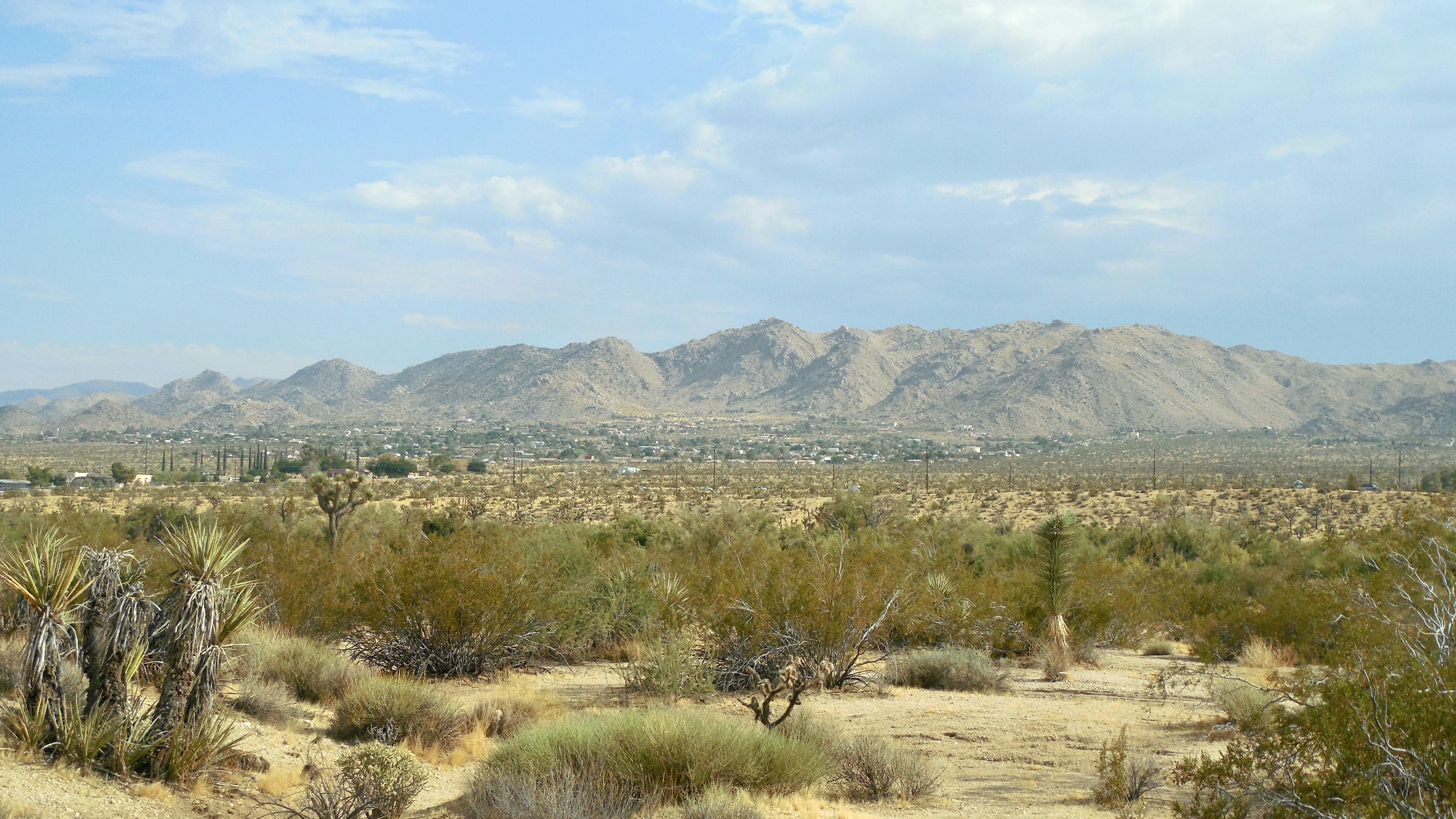
Southward view of Joshua Tree Town Center in front of the mountains of Joshua Tree National Park

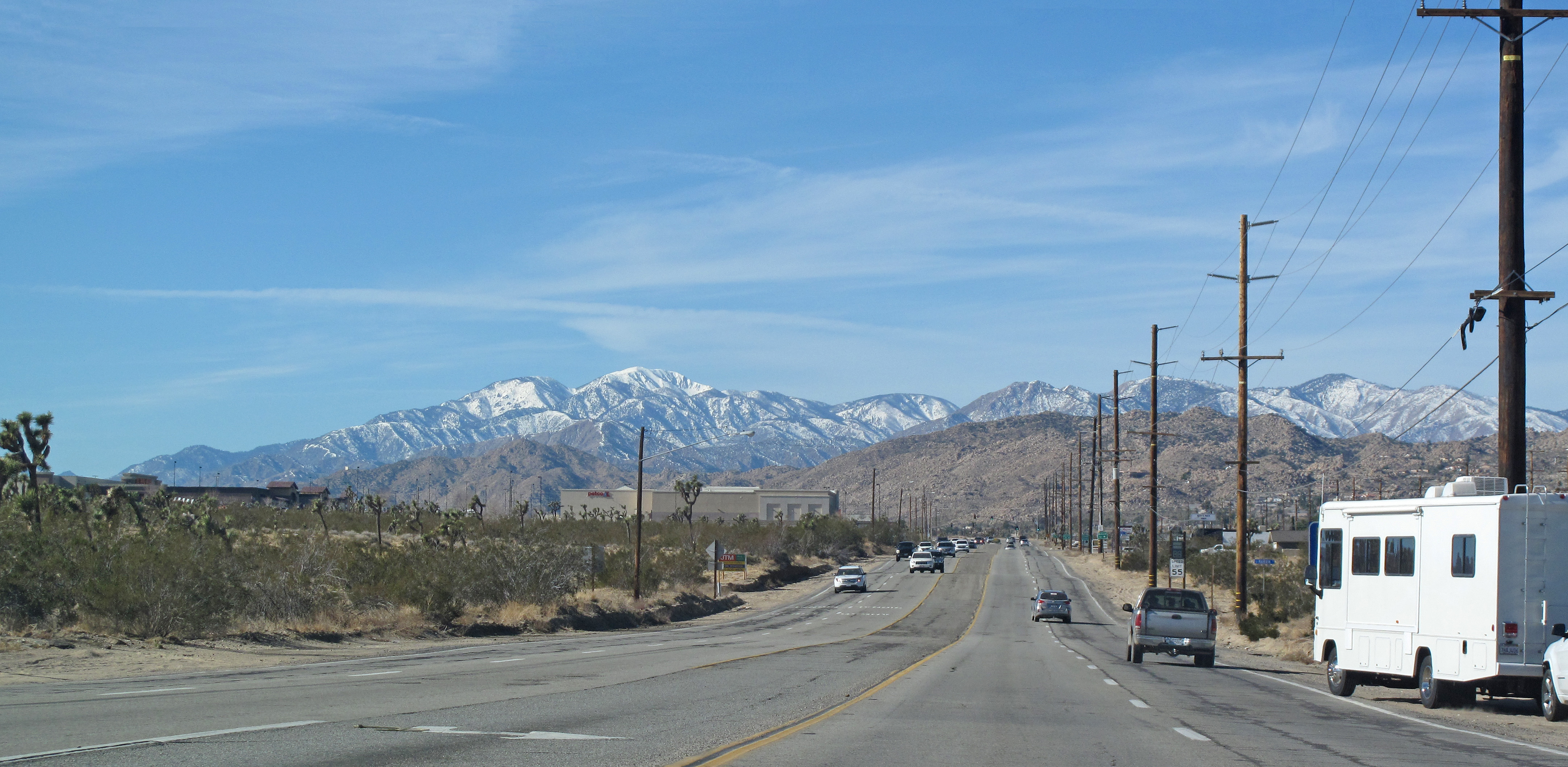
Southwesterly view of the San Bernardino Mountains from Twenty-Nine Palms Highway (CA Route 62)

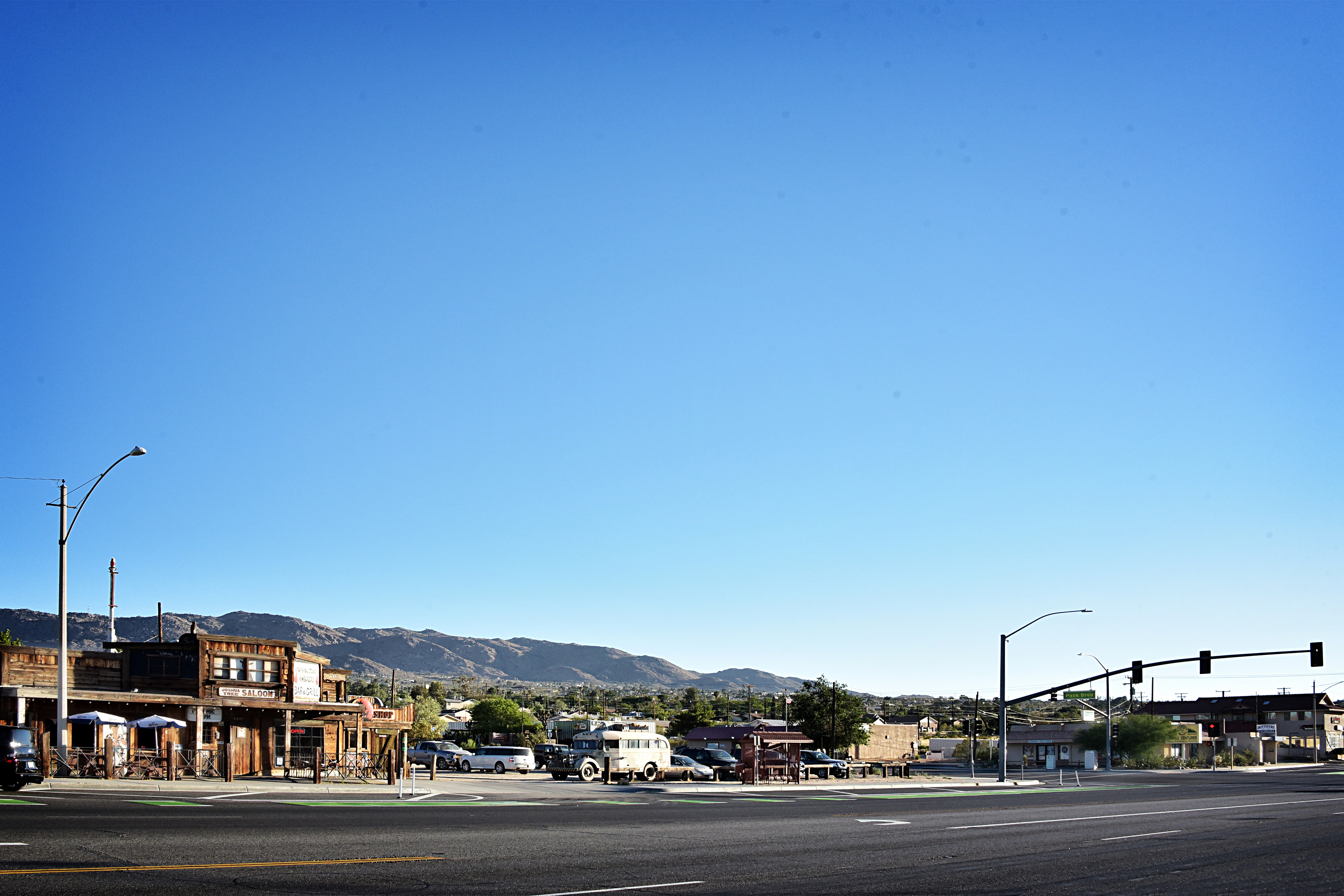
Downtown Joshua Tree looking southwest

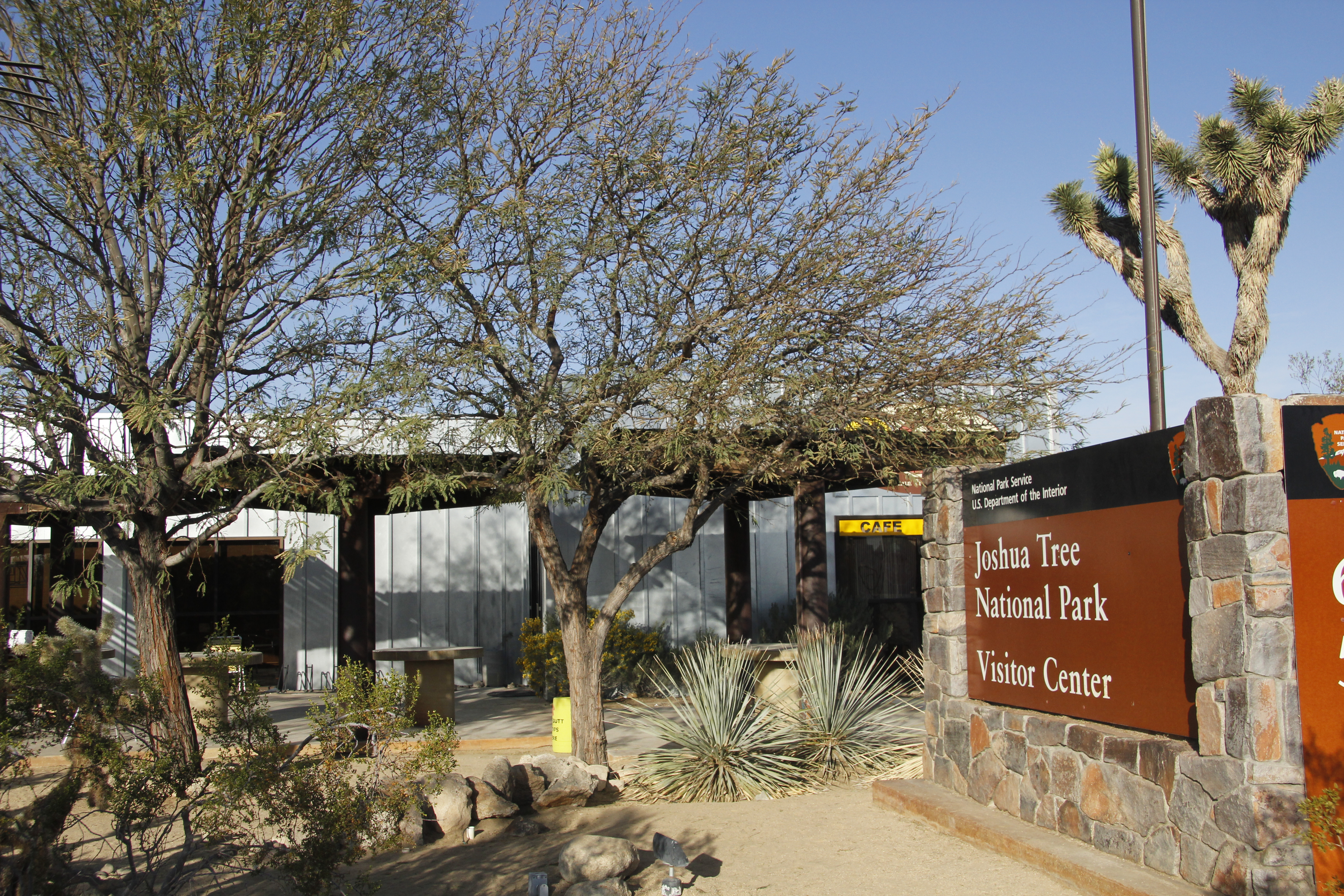
Joshua Tree National Park Visitor Center

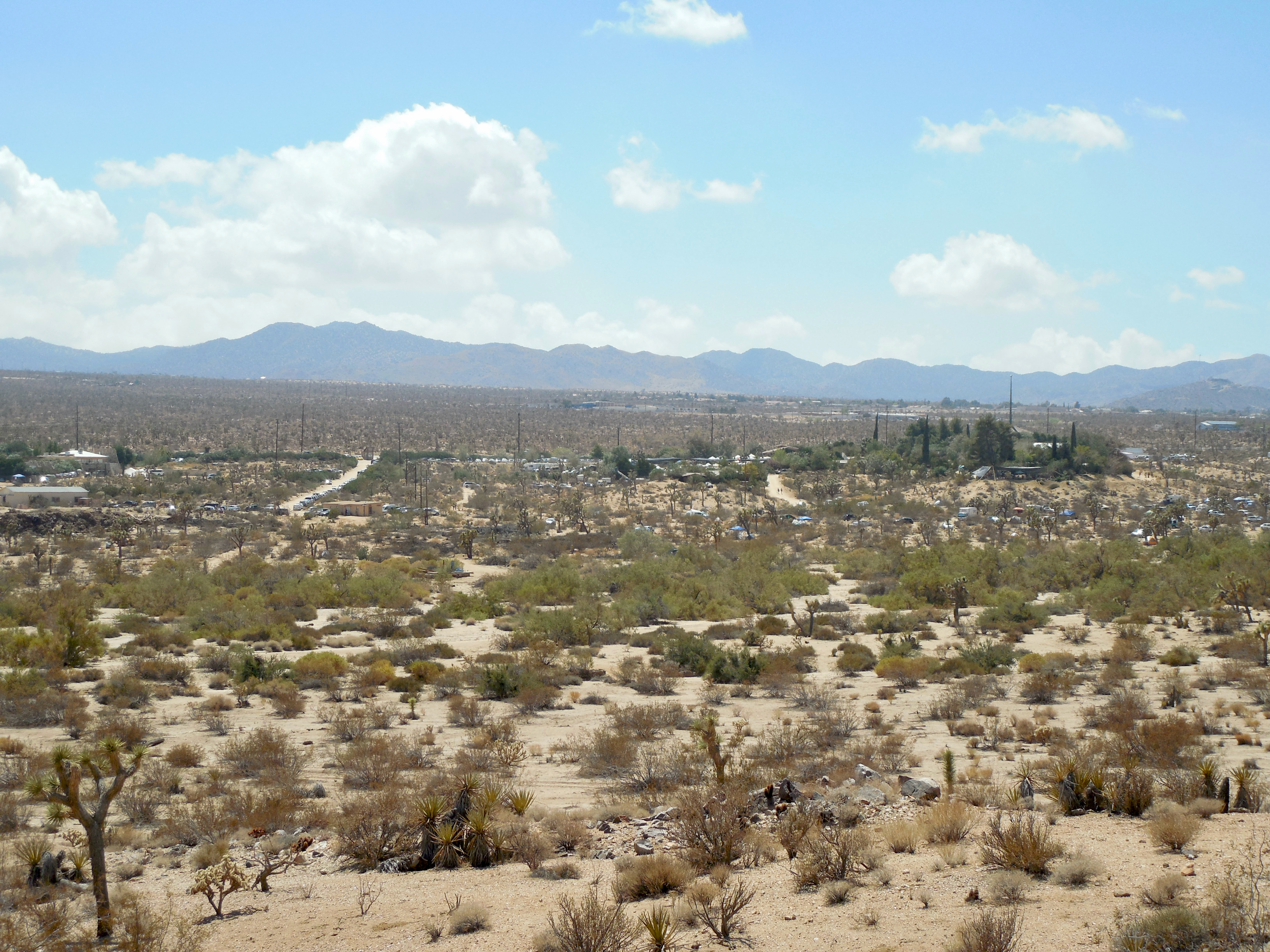
Southwesterly view of the Joshua Tree Retreat Center

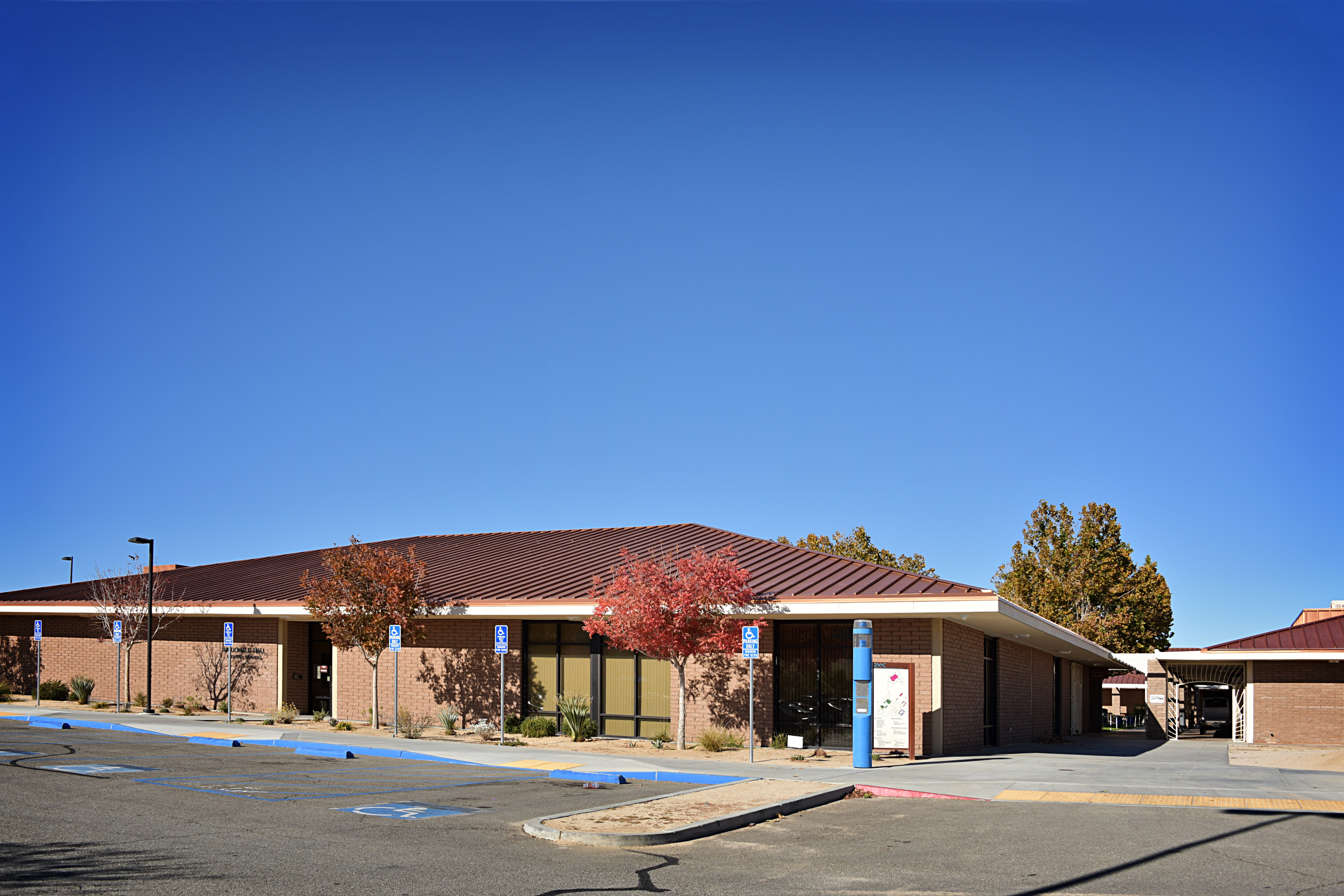
Copper Mountain College

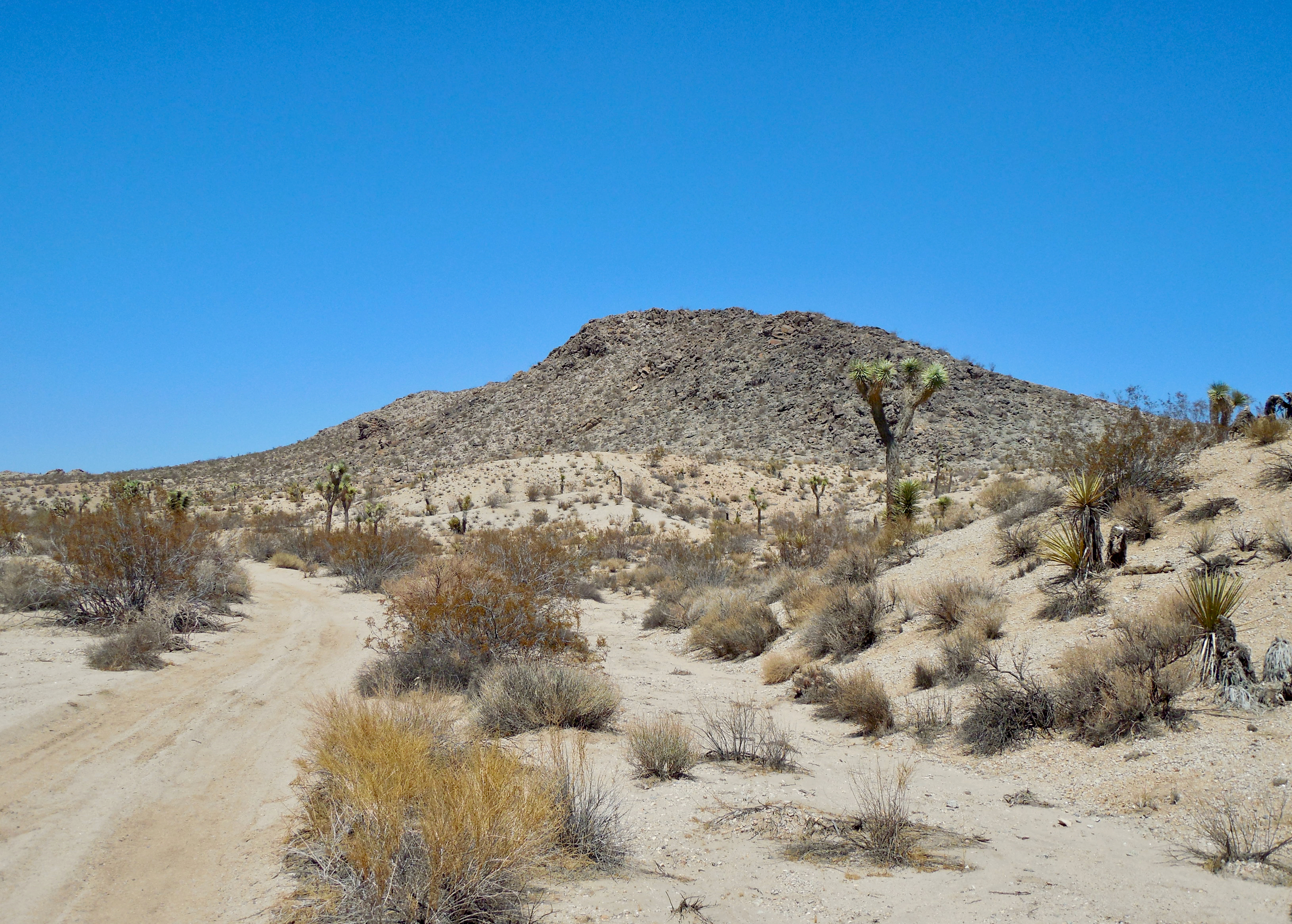
Backcountry road off of Olympic Road in Joshua Tree

== Climate ==
Climate data for Joshua Tree, California.
Month	Jan	Feb	Mar	Apr	May	Jun	Jul	Aug	Sep	Oct	Nov	Dec	Year
Record high °F (°C)	79 (26)	86 (30)	90 (32)	99 (37)	102 (39)	113 (45)	115 (46)	110 (43)	105 (41)	102 (39)	86 (30)	78 (26)	115 (46)
Mean daily maximum °F (°C)	62.2 (16.8)	61.5 (16.4)	69.8 (21.0)	76.4 (24.7)	86.0 (30.0)	93.9 (34.4)	101.1 (38.4)	100.4 (38.0)	95.8 (35.4)	81.2 (27.3)	69.1 (20.6)	58.2 (14.6)	79.6 (26.4)
Mean daily minimum °F (°C)	37.9 (3.3)	37.5 (3.1)	41.0 (5.0)	46.0 (7.8)	53.4 (11.9)	60.0 (15.6)	70.8 (21.6)	70.1 (21.2)	65.8 (18.8)	53.4 (11.9)	43.0 (6.1)	35.8 (2.1)	51.2 (10.7)
Record low °F (°C)	18 (−8)	18 (−8)	29 (−2)	32 (0)	36 (2)	40 (4)	55 (13)	52 (11)	46 (8)	37 (3)	26 (−3)	17 (−8)	17 (−8)
Average precipitation inches (mm)	0.62 (16)	0.48 (12)	0.39 (9.9)	0.13 (3.3)	0.17 (4.3)	0.01 (0.25)	0.33 (8.4)	0.50 (13)	0.33 (8.4)	0.33 (8.4)	0.61 (15)	0.79 (20)	4.69 (119)
Average snowfall inches (cm)	0.5 (1.3)	0.0 (0.0)	0.0 (0.0)	0.0 (0.0)	0.0 (0.0)	0.0 (0.0)	0.0 (0.0)	0.0 (0.0)	0.0 (0.0)	0.0 (0.0)	0.0 (0.0)	1.6 (4.1)	2.1 (5.3)
Source: The Western Regional Climate Center

== See also ==
- Yucca Valley, California
- Wonder Valley, California
- Pioneertown, California
- Twentynine Palms, California
