= Margaret Alison Johansen =

American novelist

- Born: Margaret Lee Alison; September 7, 1896; Richmond, Alabama, US
- Died: December 28, 1959 (aged 63); Selma, Alabama, US
- Occupation: Writer
- Relatives: Alice Alison Lide (sister)
- Writing career
- Pen name: Hugh McAlister
- Period: 1924–1959
- Genre: Children's literature
- Notable work: Ood-le-uk the Wanderer
- Notable awards: Newbery Medal

Margaret Lee Alison Johansen (née Alison, September 7, 1896 – December 28, 1959) was an American writer from Alabama. She received the Newbery Honor.

== Early and personal life ==
Johansen was born Margaret Lee Alison on September 7, 1896, in Richmond, Alabama, to Annie Goode Hearst and John Dill Alison. She had at least one sibling, Alice Alison Lide, with whom she sometimes wrote. She studied at Converse College from 1912 to 1914, the University of Alabama in 1918, and Columbia University in 1922. She was a member of the Delta Delta Delta and Theta Sigma Phi sororities. She married Carl Christian Johansen, adding his surname to hers.

== Writing career ==
Johansen wrote many books, mostly or all for children, between 1924 and 1950. She often collaborated with her sister Alice Alison Lide to write books, and also wrote under the pseudonym "Hugh McAlister," likely also with Lide, to write books aimed at boys. Her first known published work was History of St. Paul's Parish, written with Lide and published in 1924. She continued to publish books throughout her life, the most notable probably being Ood-le-uk the Wanderer, a 1930 book which won a 1931 Newbery Honor.

== Death ==
Johansen died on December 28, 1959, in Selma, Alabama.

== Bibliography ==
=== Published as Margaret Alison Johansen ===
==== Solo work ====
- Hawk of Hawk Clan: 1941
- Voyagers West: 1959
- From Sea to Shining Sea: How Americans Have Lived: 1960

==== With Alice Alison Lide ====
- History of St. Paul's Parish: 1924
- Ood-le-uk the Wanderer: 1930
- Pearls of Fortune: 1931
- Dark Possession: 1934
- Secret of the Circle: 1937
- Thord Firetooth: 1937
- Mystery of the Mahteb: A Tale of Thirteenth-Century Ethiopia: 1942
- The Wooden Locket: 1953
- Lapland Drum: 1955
- Magic Words for Elin: 1955
- Elin of Finland: 1960

=== Published as Hugh McAlister ===
- Conqueror of the High Road: 1930
- Flaming River: 1930
- Flight of the Silver Ship: 1930
- Stand By: 1930
- Steve Holworth of the Oldham Works: 1930
- Viking of the Sky: 1930
- Sea Gold: 1931
- That Boy at Roaring Brook Farm: 1931
