= Noah Purifoy Desert Art Museum =

Outdoor sculptural art museum in California

Coordinates: 34.1957°N 116.2882°W

The Desert Art Museum of Assemblage Sculpture was constructed by Noah Purifoy in Joshua Tree, California, between the years of 1989 and 2004. The outdoor museum is Purifoy's largest project in scale and piece count, spanning over 5 acres and consisting of over 100 sculptures of varying scale. The museum remains in operation today and is available to the general public.

== Creation ==
Upon moving to the Mojave Desert, Purifoy intended to make a collection of sculptures which would decay over time due to continuous exposure to the desert environment. Purifoy created these sculptures out of found materials including bicycle parts, home appliances, clothing fabric, car parts, toilets, and sinks. In addition to being his most expansive project, his outdoor museum also took the longest to "complete", as he worked on the project during his entire 14-year residency in Joshua Tree.

== Exhibition ==
A retrospective of Purifoy's work, titled "Noah Purifoy: Outside and in the Open", took place at the California African American Museum during 1997–1998. A number of sculptural pieces from Purifoy's outdoor museum were included in the retrospective. Many of the works displayed at the retrospective remained at the California African American Museum and are now featured there indefinitely. As a result, Purifoy’s Desert Art Museum cannot be seen as it was initially produced.

The majority of Purifoy's sculptures remain in Joshua Tree and are available for viewing to the general public. However, Purifoy's Desert Art Museum is not a traditional exhibition in that there is no rope, wall, or barrier preventing visitors from simply walking up to the group of sculptures. Furthermore, there are no attendants, and there is no reception desk or fee for entry. Thus, the museum is "open" 24 hours a day, year round.

== Reception ==
Since his death in 2004, Purifoy's outdoor museum has received some critical attention, both on specific pieces within the museum and the museum as a whole.

=== Racial stakes ===
A 2022 Detroit Journal article discusses Purifoy's engagement with found materials and thing theory within one of the museum's pieces titled The Library of Congress (1990). The Library of Congress consists of two upholstered chairs, a stove, a chimney, a bedframe, and a toilet and sink which are separated from the other items by a grid of wire and cloth held up by a wooden frame. Next to the chairs is a bookshelf overflowing with books which have been rendered unidentifiable due to weathering. Paul Benzon, an associate professor at Skidmore College and the author of this Detroit article, believes that Purifoy's use of books within this environment was a racial commentary. In combination with Purifoy's use of found objects, Benzon interprets this library as being a material space for black time and history. According to Benzon, the site suggests a tangible black history which becomes obscured through the passage of time.

=== Entropic significance ===
Through his decision to place his sculptures in the desert, Purifoy's museum has drawn comparisons to the work of Robert Smithson, and Smithson's Spiral Jetty in particular. A Sillages Critique Journal article draws on the significance of Purifoy's sculptures, in relation to Smithon's guiding principle of entropy, as related to destructive violence. This article argues that the entropic nature of Purifoy's pieces symbolically represents progressive destruction caused by violent events, like the Watts Town Riots, in urban areas. Much like Watts Town landmarks, Purifoy's outdoor museum pieces' erosion over time obscures or removes their historical and socio-political significance.

== Conservation ==
Before his death in 2004 Purifoy was vocal about his opinion on conservation efforts for his outdoor museum, stating that the work was not intended to survive indefinitely, and so should not be conserved. Purifoy saw the environment's effects on his pieces as part of the works themselves. However, this has not stopped all conservation efforts. The museum's groundskeeper, Pat Brunty, ensures that the works maintain their general structural integrity.

In 2023, the Noah Purifoy Foundation, organized by Purifoy before his death for the upkeep of the museum, created a comprehensive conservation plan for the museum moving forward. The plan includes photography and drone mapping, which ensure that the legacy of the museum lasts on, even should the structures themselves deteriorate to the point of being unrecognizable. Their conservation efforts additionally focus on community involvement through preserving materials which degrade quickly. Still, the plan acknowledges the temporal nature of Purifoy's works and maintains that their focus is on preservation and not restoration.
