= Bartlett Mountains =

Mountain range in California, United States

- Location within California

Highest point
- Elevation: 1,160 m (3,810 ft)

Geography
- Country: United States
- State: California
- District: San Bernardino County
- Range coordinates: 34°10′24″N 116°20′27″W
- Topo map: USGS Joshua Tree North

The Bartlett Mountains are a mountain range in San Bernardino County, California. The range lies just northwest of Joshua Tree.
