= Noah Purifoy =

American artist

- Born: August 17, 1917; Snow Hill, Alabama, U.S.
- Died: March 5, 2004 (aged 86); Joshua Tree, California, U.S.
- Education: Chouinard Art Institute
- Known for: Assemblage Sculpture
- Website: noahpurifoy.com

Noah S. Purifoy (August 17, 1917 – March 5, 2004) was an African-American visual artist and sculptor, co-founder of the Watts Towers Art Center, and creator of the Noah Purifoy Outdoor Desert Art Museum. He lived and worked most of his life in Los Angeles and Joshua Tree, California.

Purifoy was the first African American to enroll in Chouinard Art Institute as a full-time student and earned his BFA in 1956, just before his fortieth birthday. He is best known for his assemblage sculpture, including a body of work made from charred debris and wreckage collected after the Watts Riots of August 1965.

"I do not wish to be an artist. I only wish that art enables me to be." —Noah Purifoy, 1963

== Early life and education ==
Purifoy was born in 1917 in Snow Hill, Alabama, as one of thirteen siblings. Noah lived and worked most of his life in Los Angeles and Joshua Tree, California, where he died in 2004. During World War II, he served with the United States Navy as a Seabee, and as a veteran he was buried at the Ohio Western Reserve National Cemetery in Rittman, Ohio.

Purifoy received an undergraduate degree from Alabama State Teachers College (now Alabama State University) in 1943 and a graduate degree in social services administration from Atlanta University (now Clark Atlanta University) in 1948. Following graduation Noah took a position as a social worker in Cleveland and in 1950 he moved to Los Angeles taking a job at the County Hospital. In 1953, Purifoy enrolled to attend the Chouinard Art Institute (now CalArts). Purifoy was the first African American to enroll there as a full-time student and earned his BFA in 1956, just before his fortieth birthday.

== 66 Signs of Neon ==
In the months after the Watts Riots uprising of August 1965, Purifoy and artist Judson Powell organized the exhibition 66 Signs of Neon, composed of roughly 50 works of art made from salvaged materials as a way to "interpret the August event." The exhibition premiered at Markham Junior High School (April 3–9, 1966) with work by six artists and later traveled to nine state universities in California, eventually traveling to other venues throughout the United States. For 20 years following the uprising, Purifoy dedicated himself to the found object, and to using art as a tool for social change.

He was cofounder of the Watts Towers Art Center, adjacent to Simon Rodia's landmark Watts Towers in Watts, Los Angeles, California.

Purifoy was on the California Arts Council from the late 1970s through late 1980s, initiating programs such as Artists in Social Institutions, bringing art into the state prison system. He then moved to the southern Mojave Desert to create artworks.

== Noah Purifoy Outdoor Desert Art Museum ==
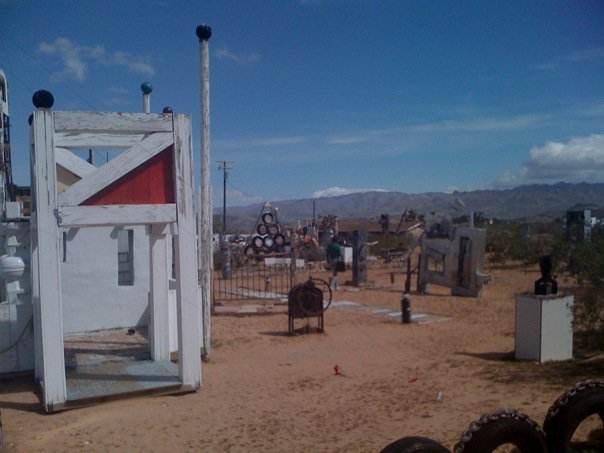
Noah Purifoy Outdoor Art Museum in Joshua Tree, California

In 1989, Purifoy moved to a friend's trailer in the Mojave Desert, and over the last fifteen years of his life built what is now the Noah Purifoy Desert Art Museum. Located on 10 acres (4.0 ha) of open land near the town of Joshua Tree, California, the museum contains over one hundred works of art, including large scale assemblages, environmental sculptures, and installation art created by the artist between 1989 and 2004. While giving the appearance of a salvage yard with tires, bathroom fixtures, TVs, ragged clothes, toys and vacuum cleaners, each piece has a story to tell. One piece has a water fountain labeled “White” and a toilet labeled “Colored”. The museum is open to the public and is maintained and preserved by the Noah Purifoy Foundation, established in 1998.

== Work and exhibitions ==
Two retrospectives of Purifoy's work have been organized. In 1997, the California African American Museum in Exposition Park mounted the first. In 2015, the Los Angeles County Museum of Art mounted a retrospective, relocating many of his works from the outdoor museum: Noah Purifoy: Junk Dada.

Purifoy's work has been included in group exhibitions including Pacific Standard Time: Crosscurrents in L.A. Painting and Sculpture, 1950–1970 (October 2011 – February 2012), Getty Center, Los Angeles, traveled to Martin-Gropius-Bau, Berlin, Germany (March – June 2012); Now Dig This! Art and Black Los Angeles 1960–1980 (October 2011 – January 2012), Hammer Museum, Los Angeles, California, traveled to the Museum of Modern Art's PS1, New York, New York (October 2012 – March 2013); Soul of a Nation: Art in the Age of Black Power, Tate Modern, London (July – October 2017); and Outliers and American Vanguard Art (January – May 2018), National Gallery of Art, Washington D.C.

== See also ==
- American installation artists
- African-American artists
- Readymades of Marcel Duchamp
