= Ood-le-uk the Wanderer =

Novel by Alice Alison Lide

- Title page for Ood-le-uk the Wanderer (1930)
- Author: Alice Alison Lide & Margaret Alison Johansen
- Illustrator: Raymond Lufkin
- Language: English
- Genre: Children's literature
- Publisher: Little, Brown & Co.
- Publication date: August 1930
- Publication place: United States
- Pages: 265
- OCLC: 625330

Ood-le-uk the Wanderer is a 1930 children's novel written by Alice Alison Lide & Margaret Alison Johansen and illustrated by Raymond Lufkin. It tells the story of an Alaskan Inuit boy who crosses the Bering Strait, has many adventures in Siberia, and returns to establish trade between his people and the Chukchi. The novel was first published in 1930 and was a runner-up for the Newbery Medal in 1931.
