= Street Manual Training School =

- U.S. National Register of Historic Places
- Alabama Register of Landmarks and Heritage
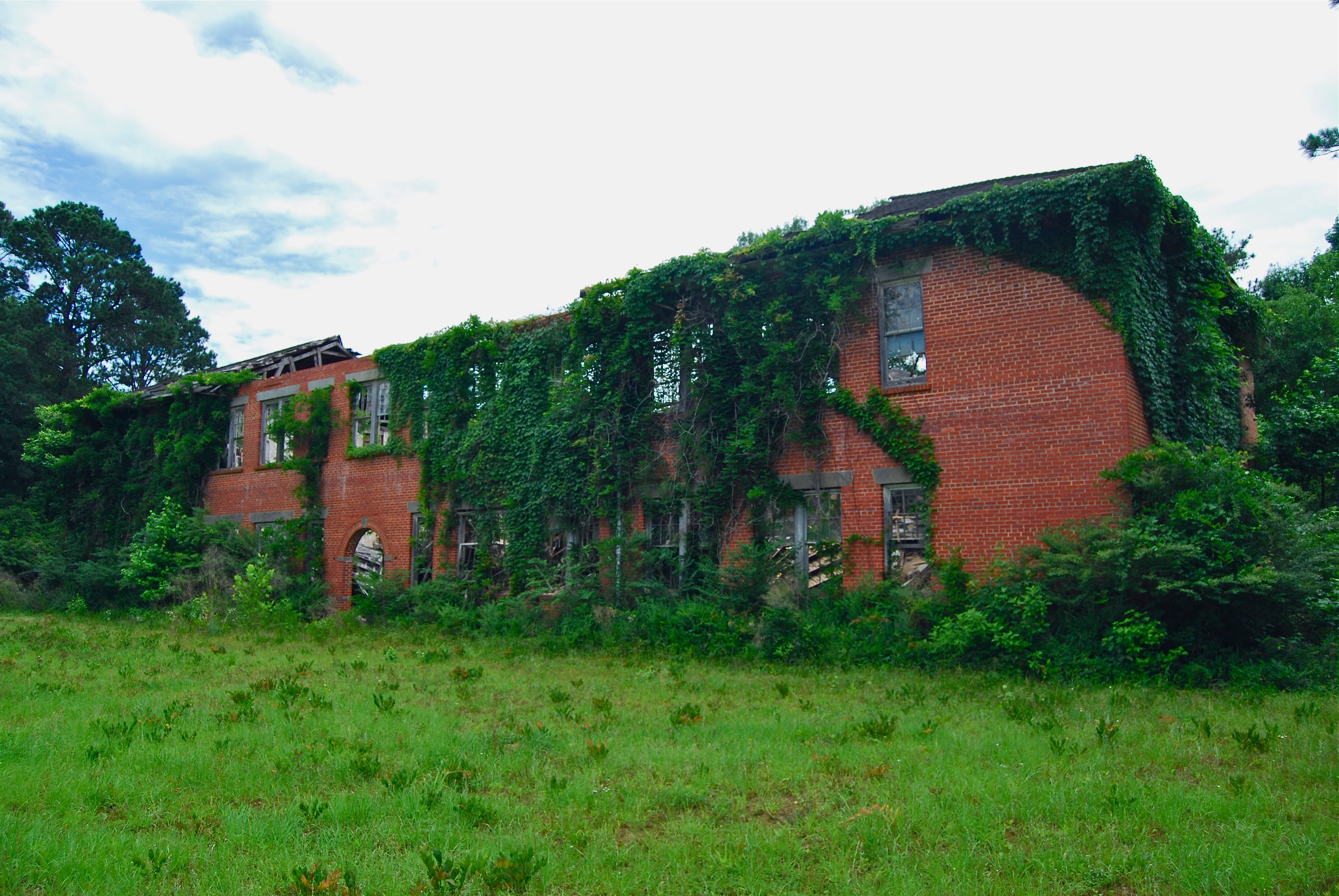

- Location within Alabama Location within the United States
- Nearest city: Richmond, Alabama
- Coordinates: 32°6′47″N 87°3′35″W
- Area: 23.1 acres (9.3 ha)
- NRHP reference No.: 99000891

Significant dates
- Added to NRHP: July 28, 1999
- Designated ARLH: March 12, 1997

The Street Manual Training School was a historic African American school in Richmond, Alabama, United States. The campus comprised over 200 acres (81 ha), but most of it was sold after the school closed in 1971. The remaining 23.1-acre (9.3 ha) campus contains seven buildings constructed between 1906 and 1964 as well as a circa 1943 water tower. The school was listed on the National Register of Historic Places on July 28, 1999.

== School ==
The school was founded in 1904 by Emmanuel M. Brown. Brown, a graduate of Snow Hill Normal and Industrial Institute and Harvard University, was a proponent of the ideas of Booker T. Washington. He was dedicated to improving the quality of life for African Americans in Dallas County during the Jim Crow era of racial segregation. Brown modeled his school on the Tuskegee Institute. He lived onsite from the beginning of the school, serving as the headmaster until his death in 1960.

Street Manual Training School

Information
- Founded: 1904
- Founder: Emmanuel M. Brown
- Closed: 1971
- Last updated: 31 December 2017
