= Elm Bluff Plantation =

Elm Bluff
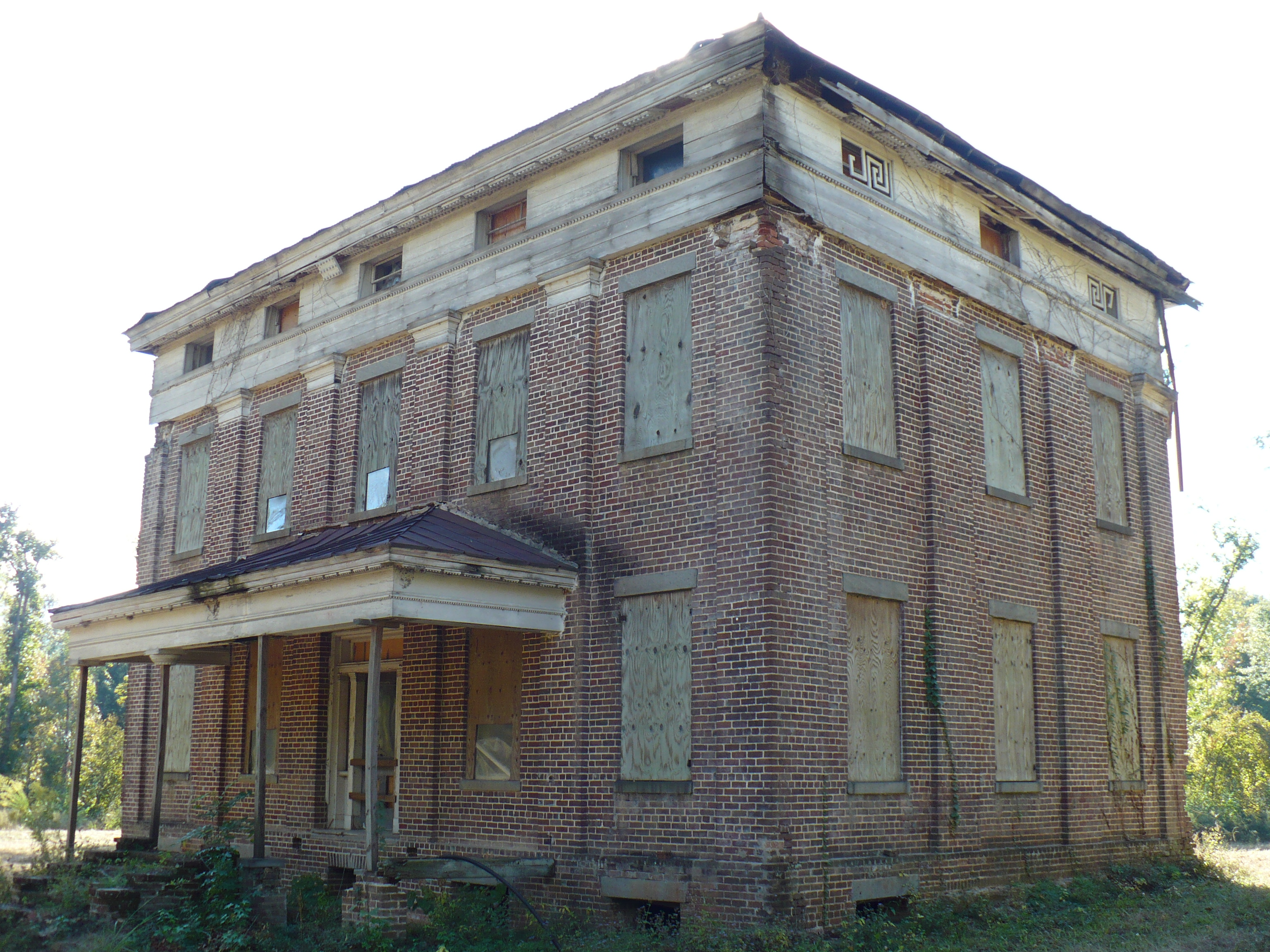
- The main house at Elm Bluff in 2008

- Location within Alabama
- 32.17074°N 87.10347°W
- Location: Elm Bluff, Alabama

History
- Founded: circa 1840
- Built: 1845

Site notes
- Architectural style: Greek Revival
- Governing body: Private

Elm Bluff is a historic former forced-labor farm and plantation house in the rural community of Elm Bluff, Dallas County, Alabama, United States. Situated on a bluff high above the Alabama River, the now near-ruinous house is considered by architectural historians to be one of the most refined and unusual Greek Revival-style houses in the state.

== History ==
Elm Bluff was established around 1840 by John Jay Crocheron, who enslaved up to 200 people to work his land.

A lifelong bachelor, Crocheron was born on August 21, 1795, in Richmondtown, Staten Island, New York. He was the son of John Crocheron and Johanna Houseman, both French Huguenots. After his father died, Crocheron moved to Alabama. He was elected as one of 12 directors for the Bank of Alabama during the 1820s, when the bank was located in Cahaba. There he established a successful mercantile business and engaged in various commercial enterprises in Mobile, including ownership of steamships.

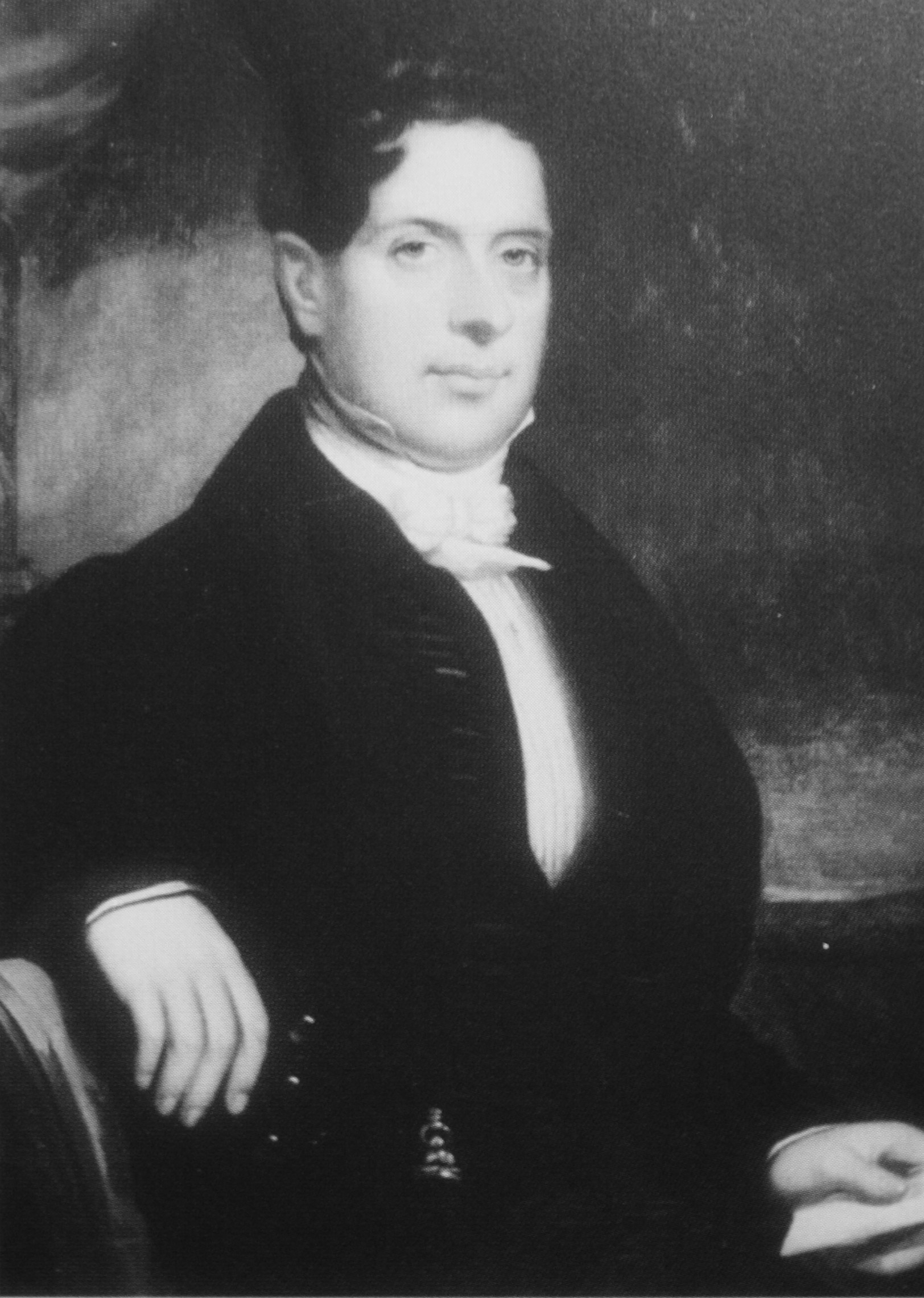
Portrait of John Jay Crocheron, painted in 1825.

By 1840, John Jay Crocheron had transferred the running of the mercantile business in Cahaba to his half-brother, Richard Conner Crocheron, one of his many relatives who had moved to Alabama from New York. His brick mansion at Cahaba burned in the early 20th century, although some of the monumental brick columns remain, known now as the "Crocheron Columns."

After he transferred his businesses to Richard, John Jay Crocheron moved to Elm Bluff, near his Crocheron and Stoutenborough relatives in Richmond, named in honor of their former home in New York. He began acquiring additional property until his forced-labor farm comprised several thousand acres. In 1845, he completed the main house.

His great-niece and longtime Dean of Barnard College, Virginia Crocheron Gildersleeve, described life at Elm Bluff in her memoirs, Many a good crusade:

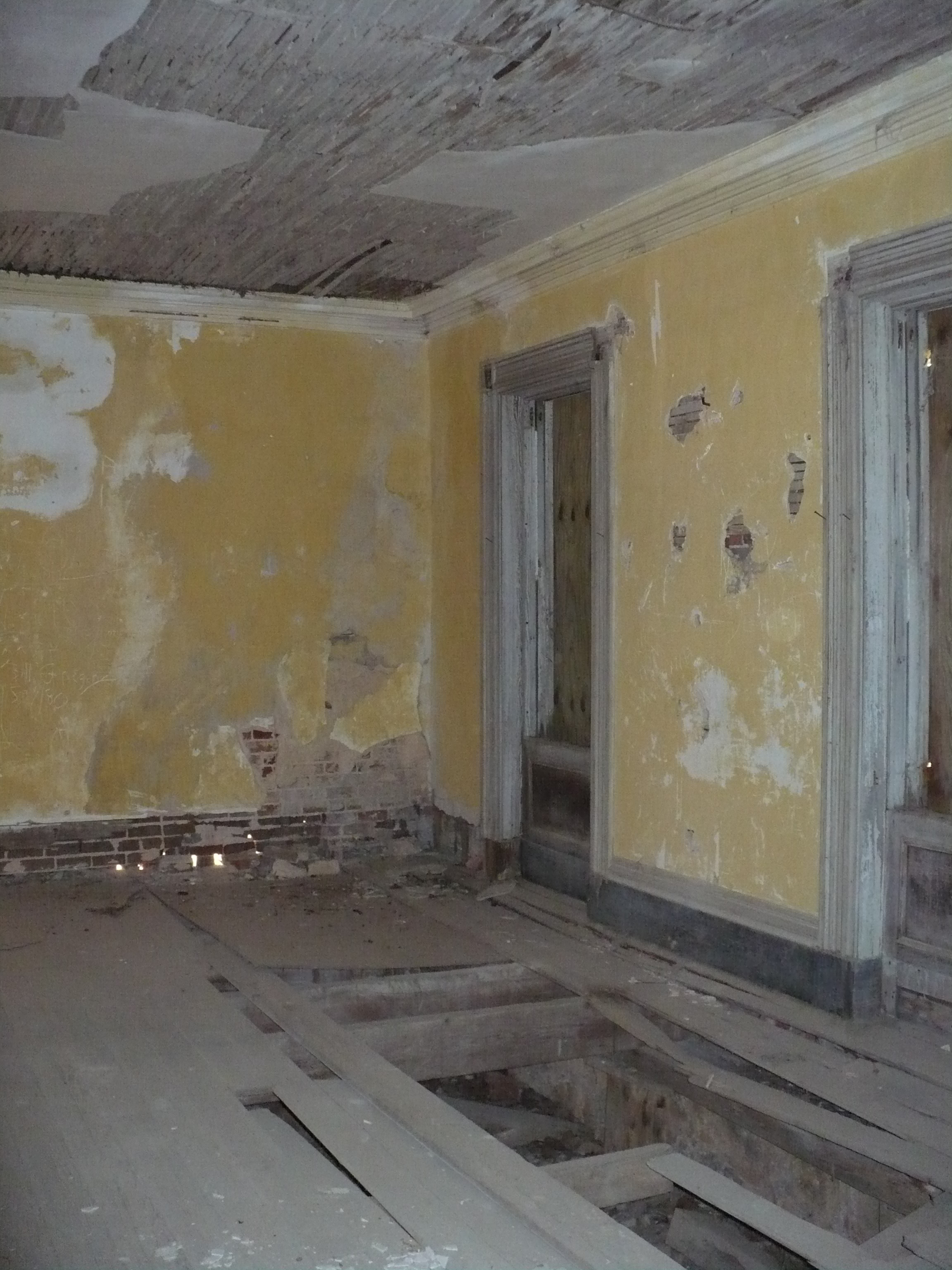
The near-ruinous library at Elm Bluff in 2008.

Elm Bluff was a large plantation with about two hundred slaves. My great-uncle entertained many of his neighbors and friends there. As he had no wife, he used to bring down from the North a "lady housekeeper," so called, who presided and acted as hostess. In those days travel was almost entirely by river steamers, which had a habit of running on mudbanks and being delayed for a day or two at a time. Gentlemen from the plantations for many miles around used to ride to Elm Bluff and settle down with my great-uncle to stay as might be necessary, until their steamer came along and carried them on down to Mobile. In the big house at Elm Bluff there was a large library, and there, laid out on a long table, were American periodicals and many European ones. I like to know this and to realize that the people who lived in Alabama in those long-ago days were not cut off from the world.

During the American Civil War, when many of his family members had returned to New York, John Jay Crocheron stayed in Alabama and helped finance a Confederate cavalry unit, named in his honor. Crocheron presented over 100 Colt Dragoon Revolvers to the men of this company at the start of the war. In honor of their benefactor, they named their company after him. The Governor of Alabama, from a stockpile of 600, presented each commissioned officer of the early Alabama companies with a Colt 1851 Navy Revolver. Four officers with the Crocheron Light Dragoons were presented one of these guns from the governor. Three of the four Crocheron Light Dragoon Colt Navy’s survive. The Crocheron Light Dragoons served as the escort company to successive commanders of the Army of Tennessee following the Battle of Shiloh, continuing until the end of the Civil War. These commanders were Braxton Bragg, Joseph E. Johnston, and John Bell Hood. John Jay Crocheron died before the end of the war, on October 17, 1864.

== Architecture ==
Considered by architectural scholars to be a "New York house in a Deep South setting," Crocheron's house at Elm Bluff serves as evidence of his Staten Island origins. Stylistically the house features details usually associated more with the expression of the Greek Revival style in the Northeast and Midwest than with that of the South.

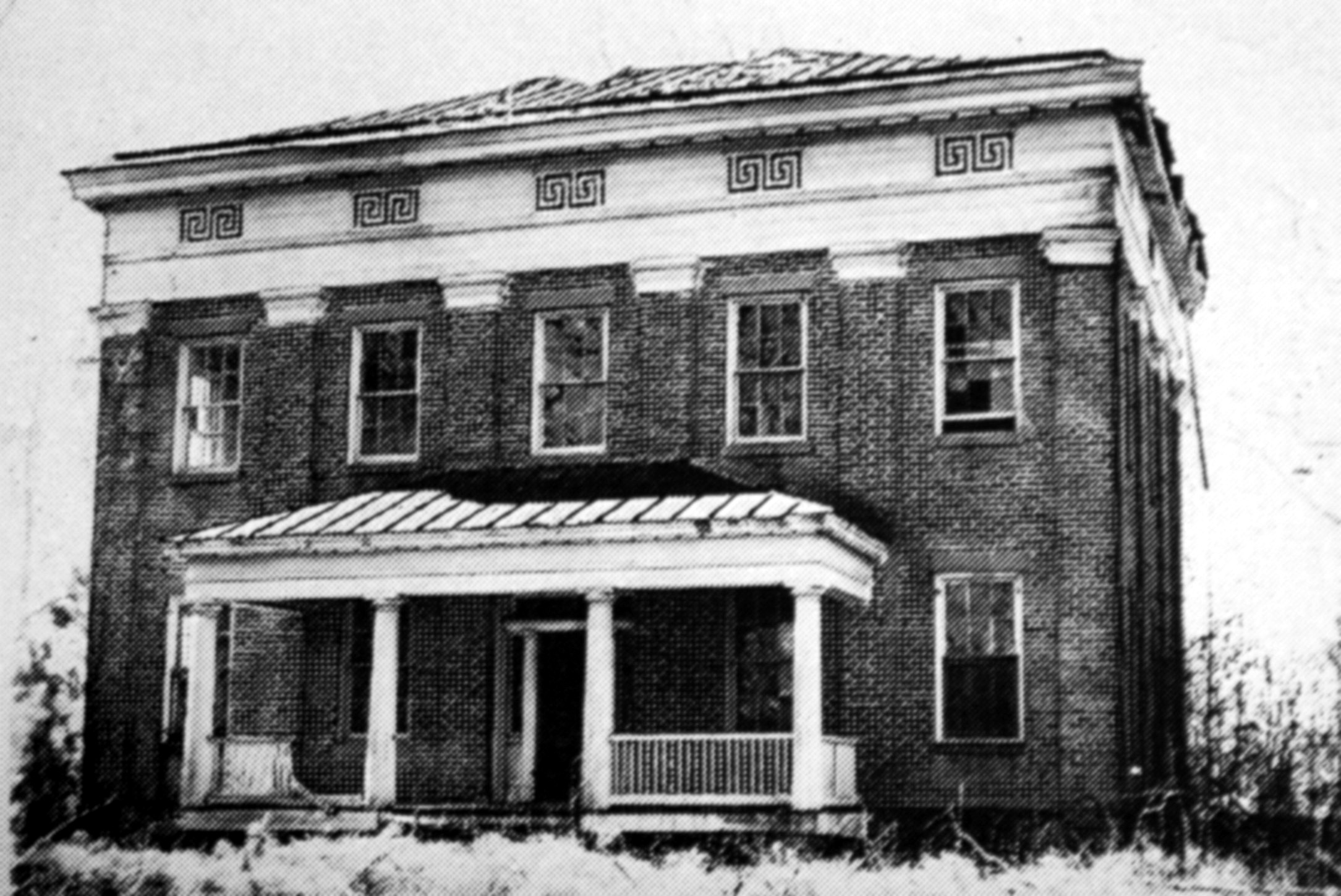
Elm Bluff in the early 20th century

The 2 1/2-story house is built of plantation-produced brick, with granite window sills and lintels. The granite was shipped from the Northeast by Crocheron. The exterior featured a one-story fluted Doric portico, now partially destroyed, centered on the front facade. The front and side facades feature full-height Doric pilasters, six on the front and four on each side. The rear of the house originally incorporated a two-story brick ell to one side, used as a domestic wing. It has been completely destroyed. A one-story rear porch wrapped around the remaining length of the main rear facade and one side of the ell.

The most unusual feature of the house is its frieze windows set into the band above the pilasters, each originally masked with wooden screens using a Greek Key motif. More commonly seen in Northeastern houses, these windows admitted light and air to the low-ceilinged rooms on the largely hidden third floor. The soffits feature mutules studded with guttae. A hipped roof tops the cornice.

The interior of Elm Bluff is divided by a spacious center hall on all levels, usually with two rooms to each side. The brick interior walls are plastered. A series of wide staircases in the central halls of each level wind up to the third floor. Like the exterior, the interior originally demonstrated a high level of finish. Many of the architectural elements were taken from pattern books, such as those by Minard Lafever and Asher Benjamin. Most of the wooden details, such as base boards, stair banisters, and door facings, have now been removed or vandalized. Details that have survived intact are the Greek Revival casings that survive on some of the window and door openings on the upper floors and finely contoured plasterwork crown moldings.

== See also ==
- List of plantations in Alabama
