= Snow Hill, Alabama =

Unincorporated community in Alabama, United States

- Unincorporated community
- Location within the state of Alabama Snow Hill, Alabama (the United States)
- Coordinates: 32°0′18″N 87°0′25.2″W
- Country: United States
- State: Alabama
- County: Wilcox
- Elevation: 226 ft (69 m)
- Time zone: UTC-6 (Central (CST))
  - Summer (DST): UTC-5 (CDT)
- ZIP code: 36768
- Area code: 334

Snow Hill is an unincorporated community in Wilcox County, Alabama, United States. Snow Hill has one site included on the National Register of Historic Places, the Snow Hill Normal and Industrial Institute.

Snow Hill is referenced in the film Do the Right Thing by the Ossie Davis character, Da Mayor, who reminisces about having played a baseball game there in 1939.

== Notable people ==
- Waverley Turner Carmichael, author
- Bill Lee (1928-2023), jazz double bass player and composer
- Noah Purifoy, artist
