= Elm Bluff, Alabama =

Unincorporated community in Alabama, United States

- Unincorporated community
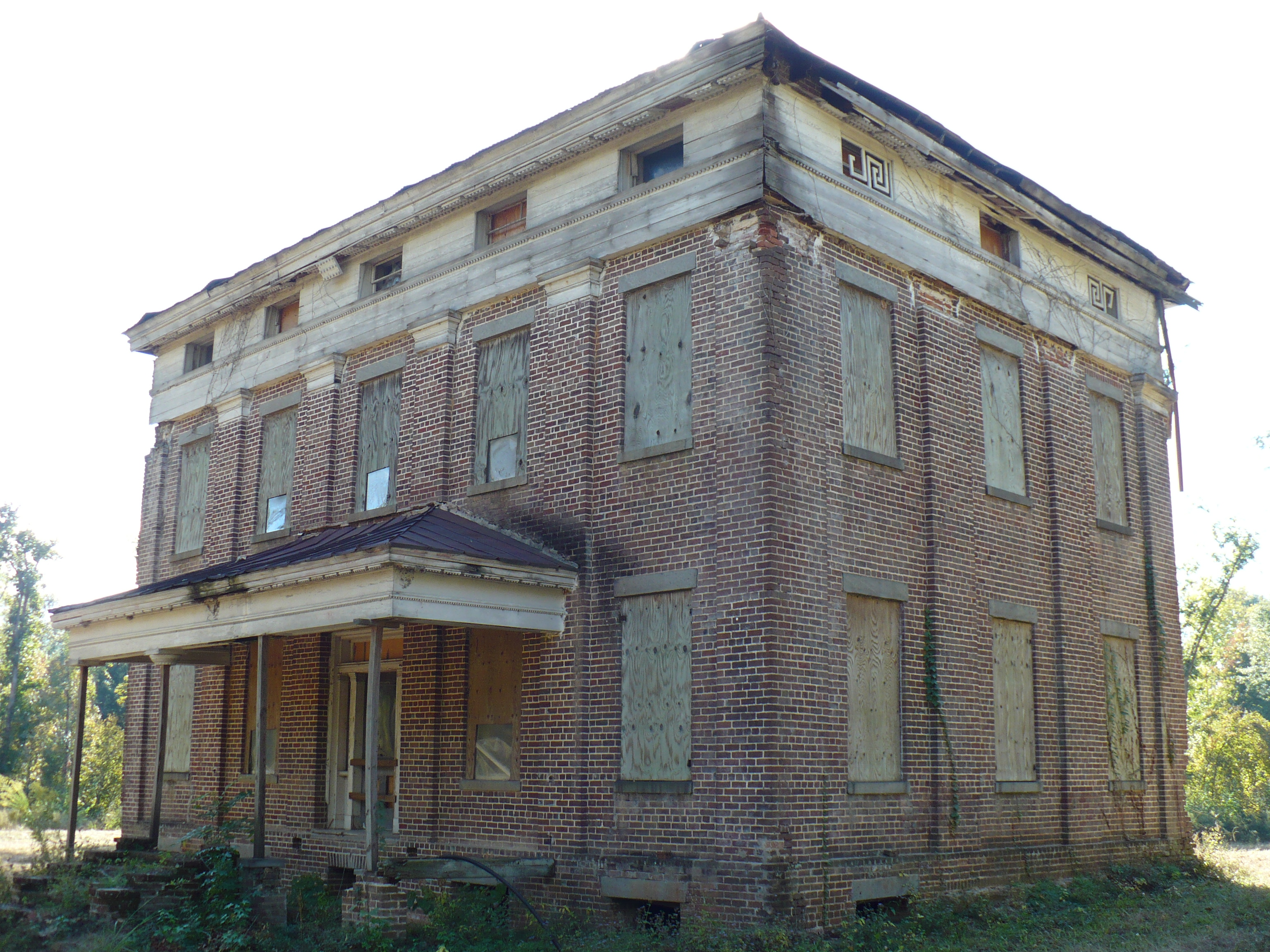
- Elm Bluff Plantation House

- Location in Alabama Elm Bluff (the United States)
- Coordinates: 32°09′11″N 87°04′19″W
- Country: United States
- State: Alabama
- County: Dallas
- Elevation: 361 ft (110 m)
- Time zone: UTC-6 (Central (CST))
  - Summer (DST): UTC-5 (CDT)
- Area code: 251
- GNIS feature ID: 117953

Elm Bluff, also known as Centreport, Shepardsville, and Shepardville, is an unincorporated community in Dallas County, Alabama. It was named for the nearby bluff on the Alabama River and the closely associated Elm Bluff Plantation.
