= Richmond, Alabama =

Unincorporated community in Alabama, United States

- Unincorporated community
- Location in Alabama Richmond (the United States)
- Coordinates: 32°06′51″N 87°03′18″W
- Country: United States
- State: Alabama
- County: Dallas
- Named for: Richmond County, New York
- Elevation: 390 ft (120 m)
- Time zone: UTC-6 (Central (CST))
  - Summer (DST): UTC-5 (CDT)
- ZIP code: 36761
- Area code: 251
- GNIS feature ID: 153148

Richmond, also known as Warrenton, is an unincorporated community in Dallas County, Alabama, United States. Richmond gained its name from Richmond County, New York, currently known as Staten Island and the birthplace for several early settlers, most notably the Crocherons. Richmond has one site included on the National Register of Historic Places, the Street Manual Training School. Elm Bluff Plantation, owned by John Jay Crocheron, is nearby in Elm Bluff.
