= Kelvin Davis =

Kelvin Davis may refer to:

- Kelvin Davis (basketball) (born 1959), American basketball player
- Kelvin Davis (boxer) (born 1978), American boxer
- Kelvin Davis (businessman) (born c. 1965), American businessman, Texas Pacific Group
- Kelvin Davis (footballer) (born 1976), English footballer
- Kelvin Davis (politician) (born 1967), New Zealand politician

== See also ==
- Kelvin Davies, American professor
