= Conecuh =

Conecuh may refer to:

- Conecuh River
- Conecuh County, Alabama
- Conecuh sausage
- USS Conecuh (AOR-110)
- Conecuh National Forest
- Conecuh Ridge Whiskey
- Conecuh Valley Railroad
