= WPNS =

WPNS may refer to:

- WPNS (AM), a radio station (1140 AM) licensed to serve Destin, Florida, United States
- WNWF, a radio station (1470 AM) licensed to serve Evergreen, Alabama, United States, which held the call sign WPNS from 2016 to 2018
- WNRP, a radio station (1620 AM) licensed to serve Gulf Breeze, Florida, which held the call sign WPNS from 2002 to 2003
- WQVD, a radio station (700 AM) licensed to serve Orange-Athol, Massachusetts, United States, which held the call sign WPNS from 1987 to 1988
- Western Pacific Naval Symposium
