= Barbecue in Alabama =

Alabama has various barbecue styles and dishes and is noted for hickory-smoked pork and chicken prevalence. White sauce, a mayonnaise-based barbecue sauce, was invented in Decatur, Alabama in 1925.

== History ==
Barbecue became popular in Alabama during the early 19th century, although its roots go back to Native American cooking styles. Local militias often hosted barbecues to incentivize their members to attend yearly drills and were also hosted as political or civic gatherings. By the late 1820s, some social reformers opposed barbecues, arguing that they encouraged "political debasement" or that the presence of alcohol and merrymaking was a moral concern. However, these anti-barbecue efforts were unsuccessful.

The earliest barbecue restaurants in Alabama were opened in the 1890s, as Americans moved into the cities because of accelerating industrialization. Pork and chicken became the primary meats served because of their local availability. The oldest continuously operating restaurant in Alabama is the Golden Rule Bar-B-Q, founded in 1891. In 2015, the Alabama Department of Tourism launched "The Year of Alabama Barbecue", a campaign to promote Alabama's barbecue restaurants.

== Styles of barbecue ==
Traditional barbecue in Alabama centers around pork cooked in open pits over hickory wood. Other hardwoods, such as oak and pecan, are also used. Smoked pork is often pulled and eaten on a bun as a sandwich with coleslaw and dill pickles. A vinegar-based barbecue sauce similar to that found in North Carolina barbecue is common in northern Alabama. A tomato-based barbecue sauce is most common south of Birmingham.

Evergreen, Alabama is known for the invention of Conecuh sausage.

Barbecue in Alabama
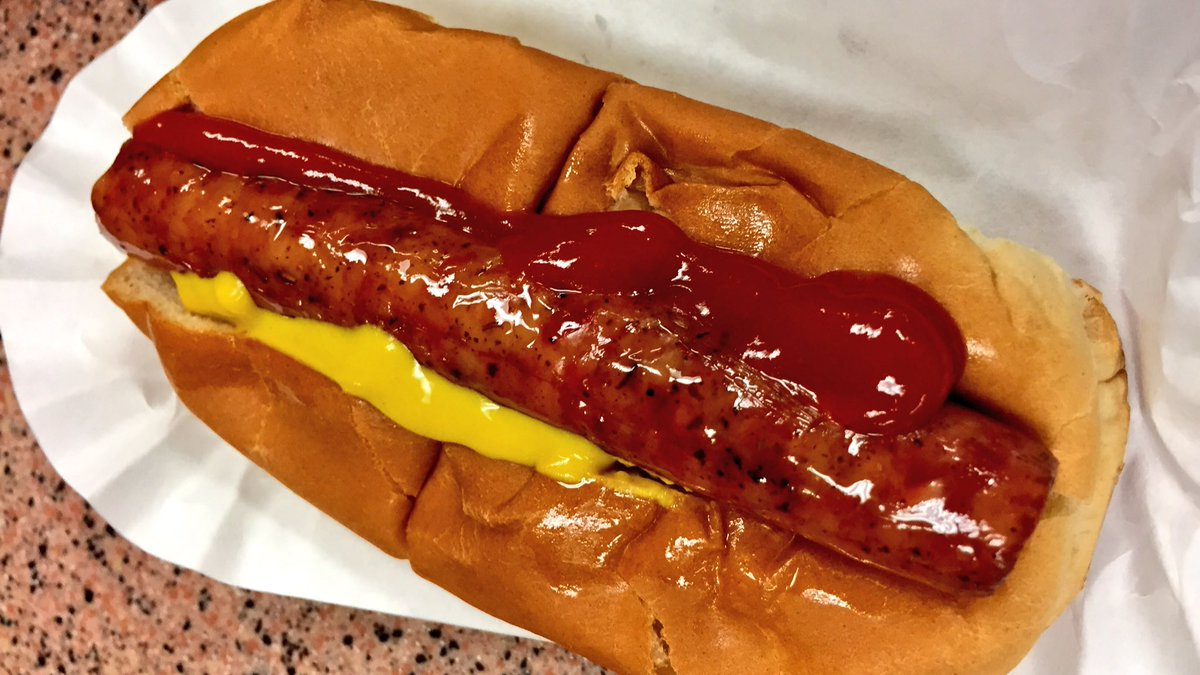
Conecuh sausage on a bun

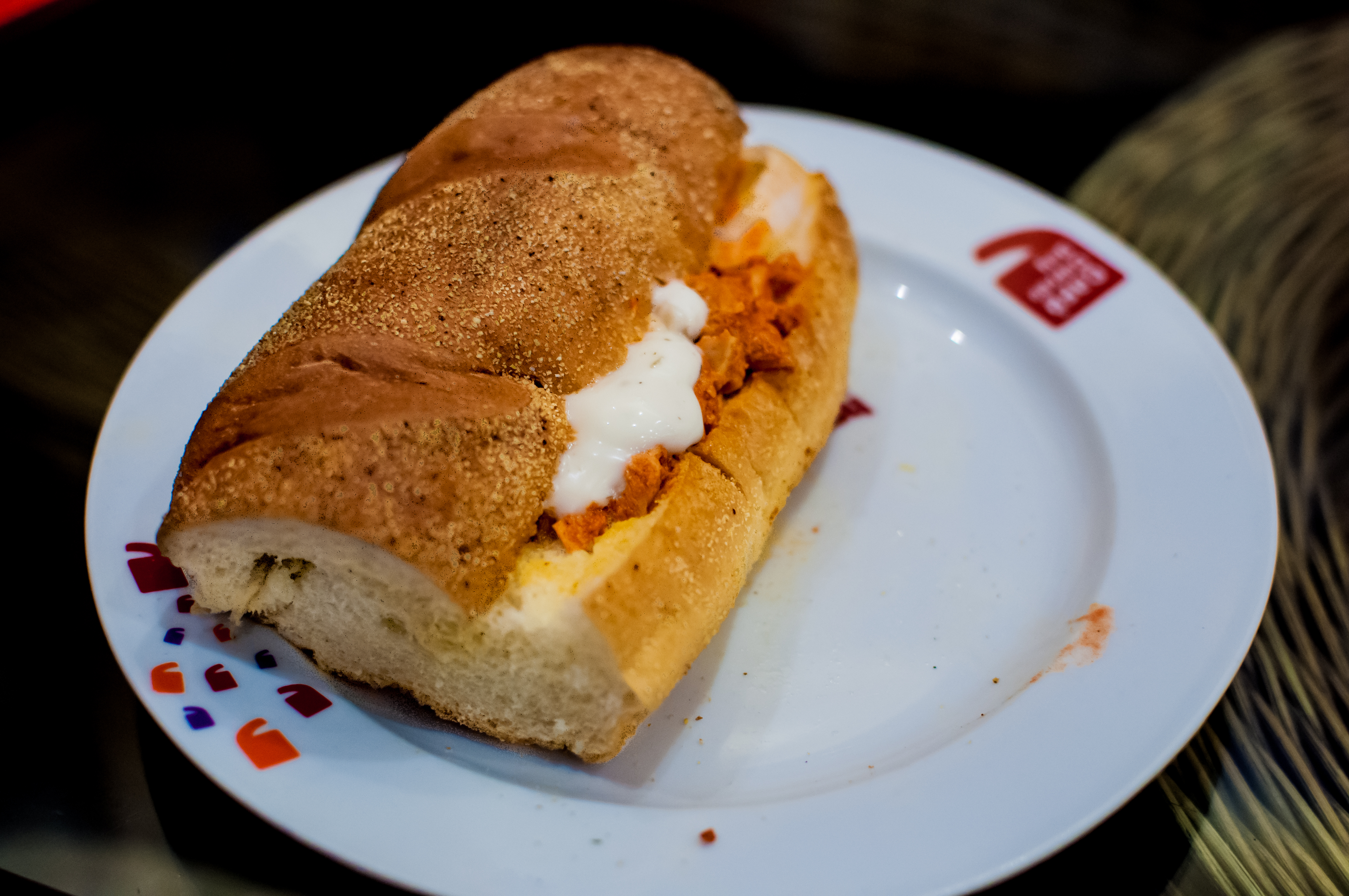
Smoked chicken sandwich with Alabama white sauce

=== Alabama white sauce ===
Alabama white sauce is a mayonnaise-based barbecue sauce commonly used with barbecue chicken, an Alabama specialty. Typical ingredients of white sauce include vinegar, lemon juice, salt, pepper, cayenne pepper, and horseradish. It is believed to have been invented by Bob Gibson at the Big Bob Gibson Bar-B-Q in Decatur in 1925. The sauce's popularity was mainly confined to northern Alabama until 1994 when it began to be bottled and sold commercially.

== See also ==
- Barbecue in the United States
