= WPPG =

- Repton, Alabama; United States
- Broadcast area: Conecuh County, Alabama
- Frequency: 101.1 MHz
- Branding: Power Pig

Programming
- Format: Country
- Affiliations: Dial Global Networks, CNN Radio, Paul Finebaum Radio Network, Auburn Tigers

Ownership
- Owner: Wolff Broadcasting Corporation

History
- Former call signs: WYNI (1994–2000); WFNU (2000–2006); WTID (2006–2008)
- Call sign meaning: Power PiG (branding)

Technical information
- Licensing authority: FCC
- Facility ID: 40901
- Class: A
- ERP: 3,100 watts
- HAAT: 140 meters
- Transmitter coordinates: 31°21′28″N 87°07′40″W

Links
- Public license information: Public file; LMS

WPPG (101.1 FM, "Power Pig") is a radio station licensed to serve Repton, Alabama, United States. The station is owned by Wolff Broadcasting Corporation.

== Programming ==
WPPG broadcasts a country music format including a live morning show plus "Mainstream Country" programming from Dial Global Networks and news from CNN Radio. In addition to its usual music programming, WPPG also airs Auburn Tigers football and select Auburn Tigers men's basketball games.

The Hour Of Praise Every Sunday On WPPG 101.1 FM The Power Pig 6 -7 PM. Format: Worship & Praise, Traditional, Contemporary And Southern Gospel Music. The Program Is Hosted By Paul Crenshaw. Also Features Church And Community News And Events. The history of this program goes back to January 1998 on 93.3 the Power Pig FM In Evergreen Alabama. It was then called the hour of Joy. Live local talent such as Melvin Johnson, The Angels of Joy, The Faithful Few, The Conecuh County Male Chorus and local and national artists were featured on the program. Covering More Than 6 Counties In South Alabama And Northwest Florida.

== History ==
This station received its original construction permit from the Federal Communications Commission on June 7, 1994. The new station was assigned the call letters WYNI by the FCC on August 5, 1994.

In September 1998, McKissick Enterprises reached an agreement to transfer the construction permit for this station to Brantley Broadcast Associates. The transfer was approved by the FCC on October 29, 1998, and the transaction was consummated on November 11, 1998. The new owners had the FCC change the call letters to WFNU on March 21, 2000. WFNU was branded as "Fun 101" and played a wide variety of music.

More than nine years after the initial construction permit was granted, thanks to an unusual number of extensions and delays, and almost five years after the sale of the still-under construction station, WFNU finally received its license to cover from the FCC on August 18, 2003. Just days before the station's broadcast license was granted, Brantley Broadcast Associates reached an agreement to sell WFNU to Great South RFDC, LLC. The deal was approved by the FCC on October 24, 2003, and the transaction was consummated on November 28, 2003. The station's offices were based in Monroeville, AL.

This station was assigned new callsign WTID by the FCC on January 26, 2006.

In February 2008, Great South Wireless, LLC, reached an agreement to sell this station to Wolff Broadcasting Company. The deal was approved by the FCC on April 17, 2008, and the transaction was consummated on June 9, 2008. The new owners had the FCC assign the station the current WPPG call letters on June 13, 2008. This change accompanied a short simulcast with WPGG (1470 AM, now known as WNWF) which was then also known as the "Power Pig". The station's current office and main studio are now located in Evergreen, AL next door to Wolff Motor Company.

== Construction permit ==
The FCC granted this station a construction permit on January 18, 2007, to upgrade its signal to 6,000 watts of effective radiated power, lower its antenna to 98 meters (322 feet) in height above average terrain, and relocate the transmitter site southeast to 31°21'28"N, 87°07'40"W. This construction permit is scheduled to expire on January 18, 2010.
