= Davern Williams =

American football player and coach (born 1980)

Hillcrest High School Jaguars
- Title: Head coach

Personal information
- Born: February 13, 1980 (age 46); Brewton, Alabama, U.S.
- Listed height: 6 ft 3 in (1.91 m)
- Listed weight: 300 lb (136 kg)

Career information
- Position: Defensive tackle (No. 96)
- High school: Jefferson Davis (Montgomery, Alabama)
- College: Auburn (1998); Troy (1999-2002)
- NFL draft: 2003: 7th round, 248th overall pick

Career history

Playing
- Miami Dolphins (2003); New York Giants (2004)

Coaching
- Huntingdon College (2006–2007) Defensive line coach; Millsaps (2008) Defensive line coach; Jacksonville State (2009–2012) Defensive line coach; Murray State (2013) Defensive line coach; East Mississippi C.C. (2014–2017) Defensive line coach; Chattanooga (2018) Defensive line coach; Troy (2019–2021) Defensive line coach; UAB (2022) Assistant director player relations; Kennesaw State (2023) Defensive ends coach; Louisiana–Monroe (2024–2025) Defensive line coach; Hillcrest High School (2026-present) Head coach

Career NFL statistics
- Tackles: 7.0
- Sacks: 0.5
- Stats at Pro Football Reference

Davern L. Williams (born February 13, 1980) is an American football coach and former player who is currently the head coach for Hillcrest High School. He has held a variety of coaching roles in college football, most recently as the defensive line coach for Louisiana–Monroe.

Prior to coaching, Williams played defensive tackle in the National Football League (NFL) for the Miami Dolphins and New York Giants. He played college football at Auburn for one season in before transferring to Troy. A three-year starting defensive tackle at Troy from 2000-2002, Williams recorded 164 tackles and eight sacks. He was selected in the seventh round of the 2003 NFL draft by the Dolphins. Williams was the defensive line coach for East Mississippi Community College, and was featured in the first two seasons of the Netflix series Last Chance U.
