= Annie Clo Watson =

American social worker

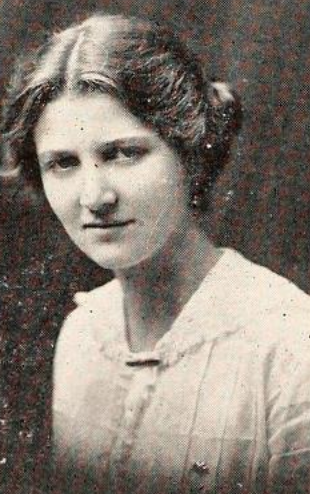
- Annie Clo Watson, from the 1914 yearbook of Southwestern University
- Born: April 26, 1891; Repton, Alabama
- Died: January 7, 1960; Berkeley, California
- Other names: Annie Chloe Watson
- Occupation: Social worker

Annie Clo Watson (April 26, 1891 – January 7, 1960) was an American social worker based in San Francisco, best known for her efforts on behalf of Japanese Americans during and after World War II.

== Early life ==
Annie Clo (or Chloe) Watson was born in Repton, Alabama, and raised in Texas, the daughter of William Watson and Mattie E. Robbins Watson. Both of her parents were also born in Alabama; her father was a doctor. She attended Southwestern University in Texas, where she played basketball and was president of her class. She pursued further training in social work at Columbia University School of Social Work.

== Career ==
Watson became executive director of the YWCA's International Institute in San Antonio, Texas in 1928. She became executive director of the International Institute in San Francisco in 1932, and was president of the local chapter of the National Association of Social Workers. In 1944 helped to found the Fellowship Church for All People with Howard Thurman. She was active in the American Civil Liberties Union and the California Conference of Social Work.

During World War II, she organized the Pacific Coast Committee for American Principles and Fair Play, hoping to mitigate some of the impact of the internment of Japanese Americans, and worked on war relocation issues at the YWCA's national headquarters in New York. "She was among those who really went to bat for persons of Japanese ancestry at the outbreak of the war," commented an obituary in the Pacific Citizen newspaper.

In 1948 she testified before a Congressional hearing on housing issues in San Francisco, and spoke on a panel at the national meeting of the Japanese American Citizens League (JACL) in Salt Lake City. In 1952 she testified before the President's Commission on Immigration and Naturalization, about the effects of changing laws on Asian Americans and Latino Americans in California, and wrote a report, "The Social Integration of Mexicans and Other Latin Americans in San Francisco and the Bay Region" for the National Council on Naturalization and Citizenship. Watson's writing on immigration was published in Journal of Educational Psychology. She chaired the International Institute's Committee for Information on the Adoption of Japanese Children. She retired in 1958, but continued as a consultant with the United Community Fund of San Francisco State College.

Watson won the Koshland Award for Social Work in 1945. The national JACL presented Watson with a Scroll of Appreciation in 1956. In 1960, after she died, the JACL encouraged donations to the Annie Clo Watson Scholarship for Social Workers as a memorial. Another memorial fund, the Annie Clo Watson Scholarship, funded a woman attendee at the West Coast Encampment for Citizenship.

== Personal life ==
Watson died from cancer in 1960 at her home in Berkeley, California, aged 68 years. Her gravesite is with her parents' graves, in Uvalde, Texas. The University of Minnesota holds a collection of Annie Clo Watson papers.
