= Spring Hill, Conecuh County, Alabama =

Unincorporated community in Brownsville, Alabama

Spring Hill, Alabama
- Unincorporated community
- Location within Alabama Location within the United States
- Coordinates: 31°21′48″N 86°47′20″W
- Country: United States
- State: Alabama
- County: Conecuh
- Elevation: 305 ft (93 m)
- Time zone: UTC-6 (Central (CST))
  - Summer (DST): UTC-5 (CDT)
- Area code: 251
- GNIS feature ID: 133187

Spring Hill is an unincorporated community in Conecuh County, Alabama, United States. Spring Hill is located at the junction of two unpaved roads, 11 miles (18 km) east-southeast of Evergreen.
