= Lyeffion, Alabama =

Unincorporated community in Brownsville, Alabama

- Unincorporated community
- Location within Alabama Location within the United States
- Coordinates: 31°32′34″N 86°59′10″W
- Country: United States
- State: Alabama
- County: Conecuh
- Elevation: 410 ft (120 m)
- Time zone: UTC-6 (Central (CST))
  - Summer (DST): UTC-5 (CDT)
- Area code: 251
- GNIS feature ID: 122114

Lyeffion is an unincorporated community in Conecuh County, Alabama, United States.

== History ==
Lyeffion is most likely named after a local family.
