= WNWF =

Radio station in Evergreen, Alabama

- Evergreen, Alabama; United States
- Frequency: 1470 kHz

Programming
- Format: News/Talk

Ownership
- Owner: John G. Ralls, Jr.; (Andala Enterprises, Inc.)

History
- First air date: July 1, 1957 (as WBLO)
- Former call signs: WBLO (1957–1982); WEGN (1982–1988); WIJK (1988–2006); WPGG (2006–2011); WEVG (2011–2016); WPNS (2016–2018)

Technical information
- Licensing authority: FCC
- Facility ID: 73372
- Class: D
- Power: 1,000 watts (day); 177 watts (night)
- Transmitter coordinates: 31°26′29″N 86°56′08″W

Links
- Public license information: Public file; LMS

WNWF (1470 AM) is a radio station licensed to serve Evergreen, Alabama, United States. The station, established in 1957, is currently owned by John G. Ralls, Jr., through licensee Andala Enterprises, Inc.

== Programming ==
WNWF broadcasts a news/talk/information format.

== History ==
This station began broadcast operations on July 1, 1957, as 1,000-watt daytime-only AM station broadcasting at 1470 kHz. Licensed to Evergreen Broadcasting Corporation by the Federal Communications Commission to serve the community of Evergreen, Alabama, the new station was assigned the call letters WBLO. Evergreen Broadcasting Corporation was wholly owned by Clayton W. Mapoles. Ownership of WBLO changed to Haskew Radio Inc. in April 1962. Haskew Radio Inc. was owned 50/50 by George B. Haskew and Carl E. Jones.

WBLO was purchased in late 1969 by the Vogel-Moody Corporation, a division of Vogel Communications, for a reported sale price of $30,000. More than a decade of continuous ownership by the Vogel-Moody Corporation ended in March 1982 when Vogel Communications reached an agreement to sell this station to Stafford Broadcasting, Inc. The deal was approved by the FCC on May 6, 1982. The new owners had the station's callsign changed from WBLO to WEGN on August 2, 1982.

In December 1983, Stafford Broadcasting, Inc., contracted to sell WEGN to Davis Broadcasting, Inc. The deal was approved by the FCC on February 14, 1984, and the transaction was consummated on February 29, 1984. Davis Broadcasting encountered financial difficulties and the station fell into receivership in late 1986. The FCC accepted the application to name Wayne Stafford as receiver and transfer the station's broadcast license to him. The transfer was approved by the FCC on October 22, 1986. On October 28, 1986, receiver Wayne Stafford signed an agreement to sell WEGN to Wolff Broadcasting Corporation. The deal was approved by the FCC on December 10, 1986, and the transaction was consummated on December 31, 1986. After a transition period, the new owners applied for new call letters and the station was assigned WIJK on May 10, 1988.

More than a dozen years after acquiring it, Wolff Broadcasting Corp., reached an agreement to sell this station and its FM sister station to Gulf Broadcasting Company, Inc., in February 1999 for a reported combined sale price of $1.5 million. The deal was approved by the FCC on April 13, 1999, and the transaction was consummated on May 10, 1999. In June 2002, the station flipped to a sports talk format during the week and on Saturday with a black Gospel music format on Sundays.

In November 2003, Gulf Broadcasting Company, Inc. (R. Lee Hagan, president) made a deal to sell this station to Star Broadcasting, Inc. (Ronald E. Hale, Jr., president) as part of a two-station deal valued at $2.75 million. The deal was approved by the FCC on April 13, 2004, and the transaction was consummated more than a year later on April 18, 2005. At the time the sale was announced, WIJK broadcast a Gospel music format. WIJK licensee Star Broadcasting, Inc., faced severe financial issues and an application was filed in December 2005 to involuntarily transfer the broadcast license to Star Broadcasting, Inc., Debtor-In-Possession. The transfer was approved by the FCC on January 11, 2006.

The station was assigned call sign WPGG on July 18, 2006. The callsign complemented a format change to country music as the "Power Pig". In mid-2008, WPGG's FM sister station became WPPG and adopted both the country music programming and the "Power Pig" branding. This precipitated the AM station's flip to a syndicated talk radio format including hosts Jerry Doyle, Michael Savage, Rusty Humphries, and Phil Hendrie.

On November 11, 2010, license holder Star Broadcasting, Inc., filed an application with the FCC to transfer control of the station's broadcast license to Omni Broadcasting, LLC. Both the original corporation and successor limited liability company are owned 20% by Jennifer F. Hale, 40% by Ronald E. Hale, Jr., and 40% by James F. Hale. The FCC approved the transaction on November 23, 2010, and the transaction was consummated on November 29, 2010.

The station was assigned the WEVG call letters on July 12, 2011. The call sign change was made to eliminate confusion with WPPG (101.1 FM) in nearby Repton, Alabama.

On October 16, 2012, WEVG went silent and returned to the air on October 25, 2012 with an adult standards format. On February 26, 2013, Omni Broadcasting, LLC filed for a Silent STA for WEVG due to flood damage. WEVG changed its call sign to WPNS on July 25, 2016.

According to their Facebook page, this station came back on sometime between October and December 2016 and is now doing Urban Gospel.

In July 2016, this station changed owners. Omni Broadcasting donated this station to Andala Enterprises, a transaction that was consummated on September 23, 2016.

The station filed a Silent STA in January 2017, citing the poor economic conditions in Evergreen. (Taken from Alabama Broadcast Media Page)

A format change is scheduled to occur, on March 1, 2017. (Taken from their Facebook Page)

The station appears to have returned to the air in the early winter of 2017, with a format change pending to news/talk programming. (Taken from Alabama Broadcast Media Page)

The flip to talk occurred on March 1, 2017. (Info extracted from their Facebook Page)

On December 21, 2018, the station swapped call signs with Florida-based station WNWF.
