= New Evergreen Commercial Historic District =

Historic district in Alabama, United States

- U.S. National Register of Historic Places
- U.S. Historic district
- Alabama Register of Landmarks and Heritage
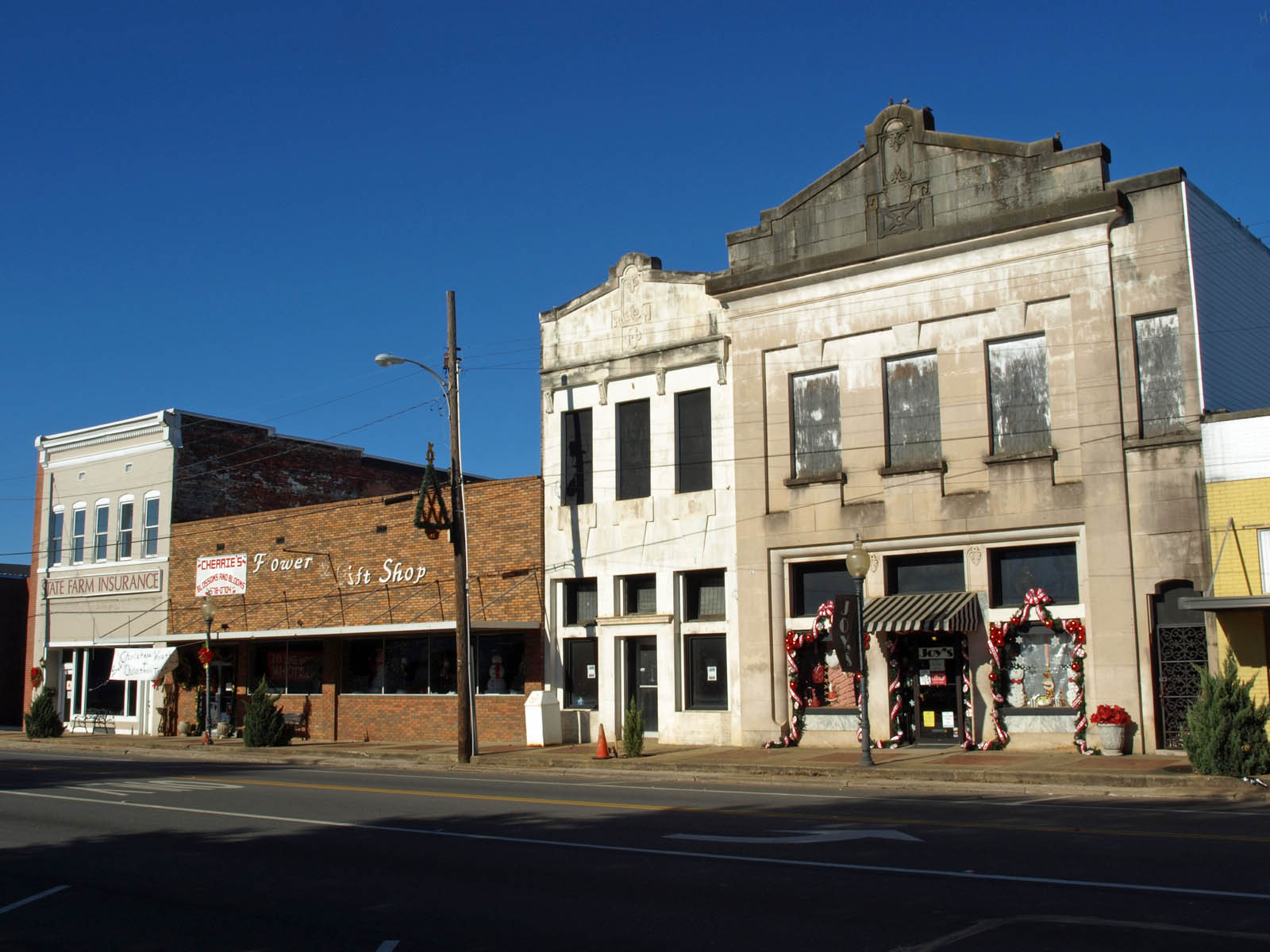

- Location within Alabama Location within the United States
- Location: Roughly bounded by Mill, Cooper, Rural, Court, Liberty, E. Front, Cary and Despious Sts., Evergreen, Alabama
- Coordinates: 31°26′3″N 86°57′17″W
- Area: 12 acres (4.9 ha)
- Architectural style: Late 19th And Early 20th Century American Movements
- NRHP reference No.: 93001542

Significant dates
- Added to NRHP: January 21, 1994
- Designated ARLH: October 4, 1993

The New Evergreen Commercial Historic District is a 12-acre (4.9 ha) historic district in Evergreen, Conecuh County, Alabama, United States. It is bounded by Mill, Cooper, Rural, Court, Liberty, East Front, Cary and Despious streets. The district is primarily commercial, with examples of the Art Deco, neoclassical, Victorian, Romanesque Revival, and Colonial Revival styles. Some are plain brick commercial structures with no distinct style. The district contains 39 properties, with 30 contributing and nine noncontributing to the district. It was added to the National Register of Historic Places on January 21, 1994.
