= Conecuh County School District =

School district in Alabama

Address
- 1455 Ted Bates Rd Evergreen, Conecuh County, Alabama, 36401-2843; United States

District information
- Grades: PK-12
- Superintendent: Tonya Bozeman
- School board: 5
- Schools: 9
- NCES District ID: 0100870
- District ID: AL-018

Students and staff
- Students: 1,487
- Teachers: 70.35 (on an FTE basis)
- Staff: 108.12 (on an FTE basis)
- Student–teacher ratio: 21.14:1

Other information
- Website: www.conecuh.k12.al.us

Conecuh County School District is a school district in Conecuh County, Alabama.

== Schools ==
- Conecuh County Area Vocational Center (9-12)
- Conecuh County Junior High School (PK-8)
- Evergreen Elementary School (PK-5)
- Genesis Innovative School (KG-12)
- Genesis School (7-12)
- Hillcrest High School (9-12)
- Lyeffion Junior High School (PK-8)
- Repton Junior High School (PK-8)
- Thurgood Marshall Middle School (6-8)
