= Cohassett, Alabama =

Unincorporated community in Brownsville, Alabama

- Unincorporated community
- Location within Alabama Location within the United States
- Coordinates: 31°23′42″N 86°41′36″W
- Country: United States
- State: Alabama
- County: Conecuh
- Elevation: 269 ft (82 m)
- Time zone: UTC-6 (Central (CST))
  - Summer (DST): UTC-5 (CDT)
- Area code: 251
- GNIS feature ID: 156199

Cohassett, also known as Lowell, is an unincorporated community in Conecuh County, Alabama, United States.

== History ==
Cohassett is likely named for Cohasset, Massachusetts. A post office operated under the name Cohassett from 1880 to 1919. After that date the post office in Red Level handled the mail. However the original post office building is still standing.
