= Kelvin Davis (basketball) =

American basketball player (born 1959)

Kelvin Davis (born July 12, 1959) is an American former professional basketball player. He became the oldest rookie to play in the American Basketball Association, when he debuted at age 47 during the 2006–07 season for the Atlanta Vision.

== Early life ==
Davis was born in New Brunswick, New Jersey, on July 12, 1959, to parents Matthew and Verba Davis. In 1961, his family moved to Evergreen, Alabama, where he played football, basketball and baseball, and ran track. In basketball, Kelvin averaged 21 points per game. Kelvin made the all state Team and was the most valuable player in Conecuh County, Alabama.

After graduating from high school Davis was offered a basketball scholarship to Jefferson Davis Jr. College in Brewton, Alabama. Two years later he was offered a scholarship to Alabama State University (ASU). In 1982 he graduated from ASU with a degree in Physical Education with a minor in Biology.

== Professional career ==
=== Atlanta Vision (2006–2007) ===
At the age of 47, Davis' dream was realized when he was recruited by the Atlanta Vision of the American Basketball Association by its coach Dennis Scott, formerly of the Orlando Magic. Davis became the oldest rookie in the history of the ABA. Davis' ultimate goal is to play in the NBA.

In September 2021, Davis tried out for the Birmingham Squadron of the NBA G League.

== Personal life ==
In 1982, Davis became a member of Rice Temple Church where he met his wife Stephanie. They have three children: born Danielle, Kelvin Jr. and Princeton Davis.

In 1991, Davis moved to Huntsville, Alabama, where he Pastored the Victory Temple Church. He also started teaching in the Huntsville City Schools district. In 2004 Davis moved to Atlanta, Georgia, where he started a paint contracting business. He never lost the passion and love of basketball and his dream of becoming a professional basketball player.
