= Paul, Alabama =

Unincorporated community in Brownsville, Alabama

- Unincorporated community
- Location within Alabama Location within the United States
- Coordinates: 31°19′13″N 86°44′38″W
- Country: United States
- State: Alabama
- County: Conecuh
- Elevation: 213 ft (65 m)
- Time zone: UTC-6 (Central (CST))
  - Summer (DST): UTC-5 (CDT)
- Area code: 251
- GNIS feature ID: 155189

Paul, also known as New Providence, is an unincorporated community in Conecuh County, Alabama, United States.

== History ==
Paul was named for Paul the Apostle. Paul was settled in the 1870s by immigrants from South Carolina. David Robinson served as the first postmaster.

A post office operated under the name Paul from 1908 to 1988.

The Old Paul Post Office was added to the Alabama Register of Landmarks and Heritage in 2013.
