= Skinnerton, Alabama =

Unincorporated community in Brownsville, Alabama

- Unincorporated community
- Location within Alabama Location within the United States
- Coordinates: 31°40′12″N 87°03′54″W
- Country: United States
- State: Alabama
- County: Conecuh
- Elevation: 528 ft (161 m)
- Time zone: UTC-6 (Central (CST))
  - Summer (DST): UTC-5 (CDT)
- Area code: 251
- GNIS feature ID: 126937

Skinnerton is an unincorporated community in Conecuh County, Alabama, United States.

== History ==
Skinnerton was named for William M. Skinner, who served as the first postmaster.

A post office operated under the name Skinnerton from 1888 to 1926.
