= Conecuh Sausage =

American pork sausage

- Company type: Private
- Industry: Food processing
- Founded: 1947; 79 years ago
- Website: conecuhsausage.com

Conecuh Sausage
- Type: Sausage
- Place of origin: Evergreen, Conecuh County, Alabama
- Associated cuisine: Cuisine of the Southern United States
- Main ingredients: Ground pork

Conecuh Sausage is a brand of hickory smoked pork sausage made in Conecuh County, Alabama.

== History ==
Conecuh Sausage was first created by Henry Sessions, who founded the company Sessions Quick Freeze in 1947. Sessions initially founded the company as a meat locker but later began producing smoked meats including Conecuh sausage. The sausage became a local staple, and is the center of a sausage festival held annually in Evergreen, Alabama. In 2015, the company produced between 30,000 and 40,000 pounds of sausage each day.

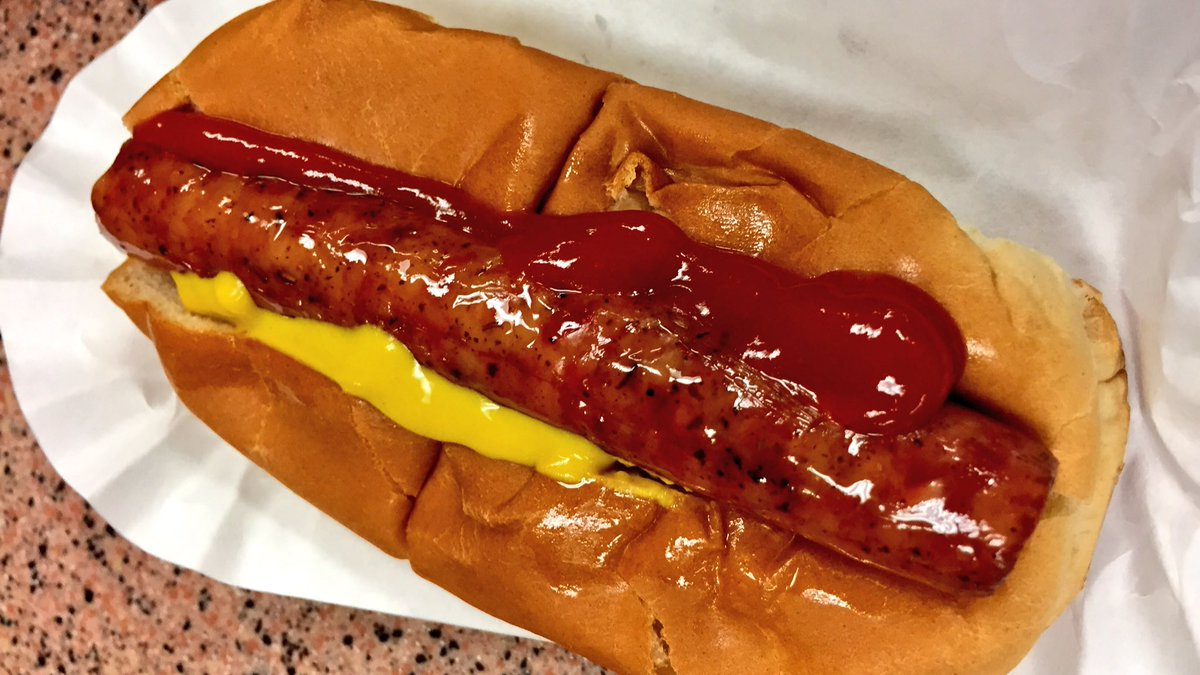
Conecuh Sausage on a bun with mustard and ketchup.

In 2021, the company opened a gift shop located near Evergreen on Interstate 65.

In 2024, the company announced the construction of a second production facility in Andalusia.

== Products ==
The company produces pork sausage made with natural hog or sheep sausage casing. The meat is mixed with a secret seasoning and smoked over hickory wood. The sausage comes in Original, Spicy and Hot, Cracked Black Pepper, Cajun, and All-Natural (which is made without MSG). In addition to sausage, the company also produces bacon, ham, turkey, hot dogs, and grilling seasonings. Conecuh is distributed nationally by Amazon, Walmart, Sam's Club, Publix, Costco, and local retailers.

In 2026, Jack's added a Conecuh sausage dog to their menu.

== See also ==
- Barbecue in Alabama
