= Jack's =

American fast-food restaurant chain

Jack's Family Restaurants, LP

- Jack's in Collinsville, Alabama
- Trade name: Jack's
- Type: Private
- Industry: Restaurant
- Genre: Fast food
- Predecessor: Jack's' Hamburgers
- Founded: Jack's' Hamburgers: November 21, 1960; 66 years ago Homewood, Alabama; Jack's: 1975; 51 years ago Birmingham, Alabama
- Founder: Jack Caddell
- Headquarters: Birmingham, Alabama, U.S.
- Number of locations: 258 as of June 28, 2024
- Area served: Alabama, Arkansas, Georgia, Tennessee, and Mississippi
- Key people: Dana Taylor (CEO); Matthew Lallatin (CFO); Billie Jo Waara (CMO); Steve Lisner (COO)
- Products: Hamburgers • Fried chicken • French fries • Soft drinks • Breakfast
- Revenue: ▲US$940 million (FY 2021) ▲US$500 million (FY 2020)
- Number of employees: 7,200 as of 2023
- Website: eatatjacks.com

Jack's Family Restaurants is an American fast food restaurant chain, headquartered and based in Birmingham, Alabama. Restaurants feature sit-down dining, drive-thrus and takeout service. The menu features primarily burgers, fried chicken, breakfast and various other fast food items including french fries and soft drinks.

As of November 2025, there were 280 Jack's restaurants in operation; all corporate owned. The company opens new locations at a rate of 20 per year.

== History ==
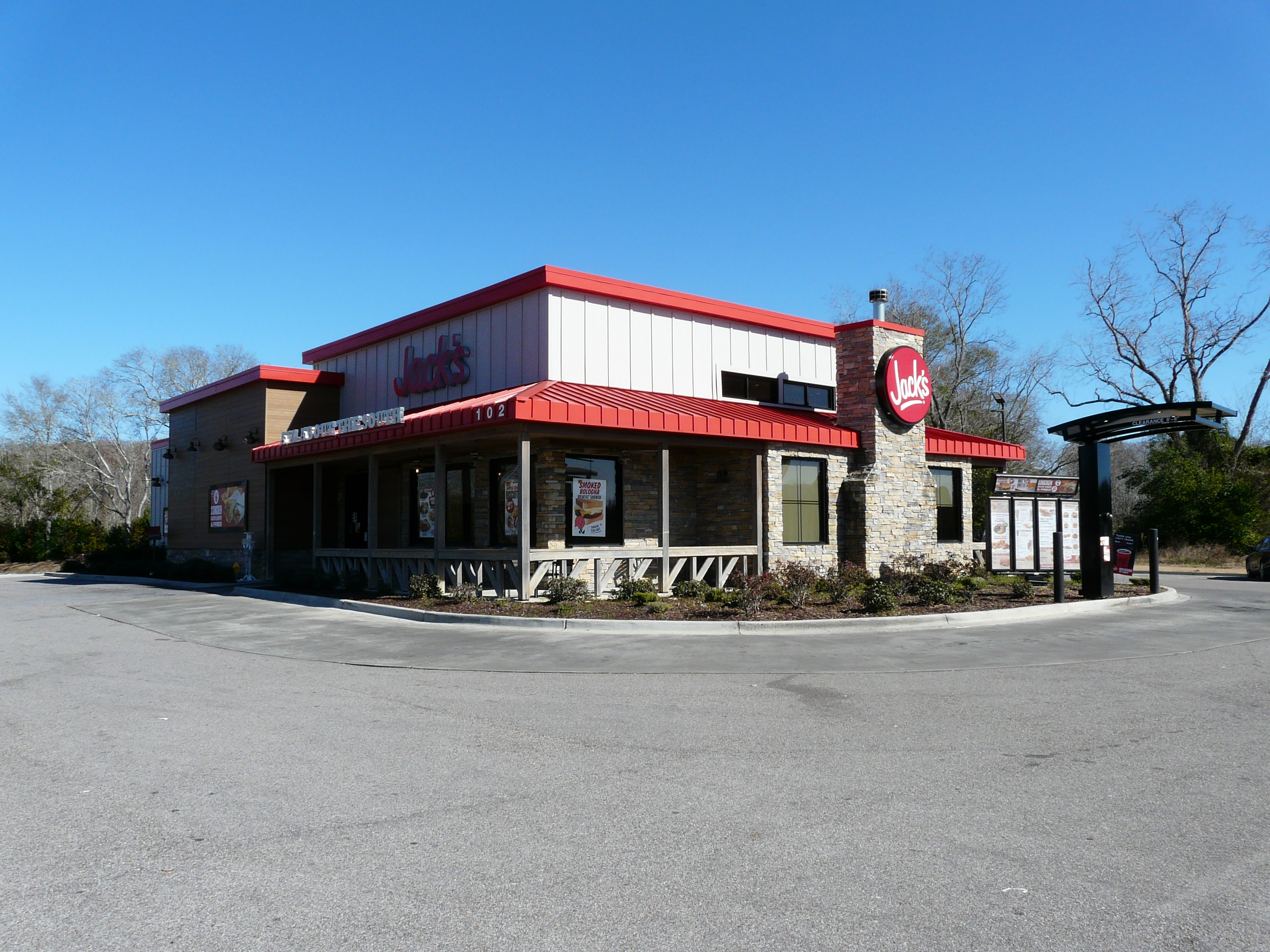
Jack's in Ashford, Alabama

Jack's was founded on November 21, 1960, by Jack Caddell (1927–1991) as a single walk-up stand in Homewood, Alabama, a suburb of Birmingham. This location still operates today after several remodels, the most recent in 2019, and is the chain's flagship store.

The original menu featured items such as fifteen-cent hamburgers and fries, twenty-cent shakes, and a twenty-cent "Fish-On-A-Bun." By the mid-1960s, they had more than a half dozen locations in the Birmingham metro area: the original Homewood store, Roebuck, 3rd Avenue West, Bessemer, Five Points West, Vestavia, Eastwood Mall, Alabaster and Center Point, and additional stores as far away as Mississippi, South Carolina, and Gatlinburg, Tennessee. Jack's was one of the first fast-food chains to market to children, heavily sponsoring local programming such as "The Popeye Show".

In the mid to late 1970s, Jack's was expanding into south Alabama and the Florida panhandle. In the 1980s many of these locations began to close, but at least one individual was having success with Jack's. Benny LaRussa, primarily involved in the grocery business with Bruno's grocery, had purchased a single franchise in the 1960s. In 1979, LaRussa abandoned groceries and purchased a franchise territory of 13 Jack's stores. From then until 1988 he expanded his territory to 33 stores. Then, in 1988, LaRussa purchased the total franchise rights to the Jack's concept. In 2015, Jack's was acquired by a fund managed by Onex Corporation, a private equity company based in Toronto, Canada.

On July 25, 2019, Onex announced that it had reached a deal to sell Jack's Family Restaurants in a deal expected to close in the third quarter of 2019. The deal finally closed in August 2019. Onex did not disclose the buyer or financial terms of the deal, but Restaurant Business Online reported that AEA Investors, a private equity firm based in New York, is the buyer of the restaurant chain.

== Menu ==
Jack's specialty is its breakfast. Biscuit sandwiches are the predominant breakfast item, including the smoked sausage, country ham, egg, cheese, bacon, sausage and country fried steak options. Jack's also serves pancake breakfasts, wraps, and a variety of sides, such as hash browns, grits, and gravy. For lunch and dinner, the signature item is the Big Jack, a double patty cheeseburger with lettuce, onions, tomato, pickles, mustard, ketchup, and mayonnaise. The lunch and dinner menu also includes a variety of side items, including French fries, coleslaw, green beans, mashed potatoes and biscuits. They also offer boneless chicken tenders which are served with a variety of dipping sauces, bone-in fried chicken plates, fried and grilled chicken sandwiches, and a number of salads which can be topped with either grilled or fried chicken. Desserts include their signature fried pies, hand-spun milkshakes, and ice cream. Seasonal and limited-time offerings also appear on some menus, such as lemonade shakes and the Mushroom & Swiss Burger.

In 2026, Jack's added a Conecuh sausage dog to their menu.

== Trademark design ==
Jack's restaurants were originally walk-up stands with a slanted roof and vertical orange and yellow stripes on each side. In the late 1960s, the chain began converting their walk-up stands to full, dine-in restaurants. Most upgraded restaurants featured faux stone walls.

The original signs were on 5 poles and featured "Jack's" in five individual white rectangles on top with the word "Hamburgers" on a separate sign underneath. A small round sign below had the price of the hamburgers, "15¢". Another sign that shared 3 poles and had "Fries 15¢ Shakes 20¢" written on it, and the final sign shared the opposite 3 poles and had "Self-Service" written on it.

In the mid-1970s, Jack's began using new signage featuring the name written on an angle in white inside a red circle; the word "Hamburgers" was dropped. In the early 2000s, Jack's changed the logo from the original, all capital font to a mixed-case font. It still appears on the familiar red circle, but the circle is smaller so that the text extends outside of it.

== See also ==
- Milo's Hamburgers, another Alabama-based burger restaurant similar to Jack's
- List of hamburger restaurants
