= Shreve, Alabama =

Unincorporated community in Conecuh County, Alabama

- Unincorporated community
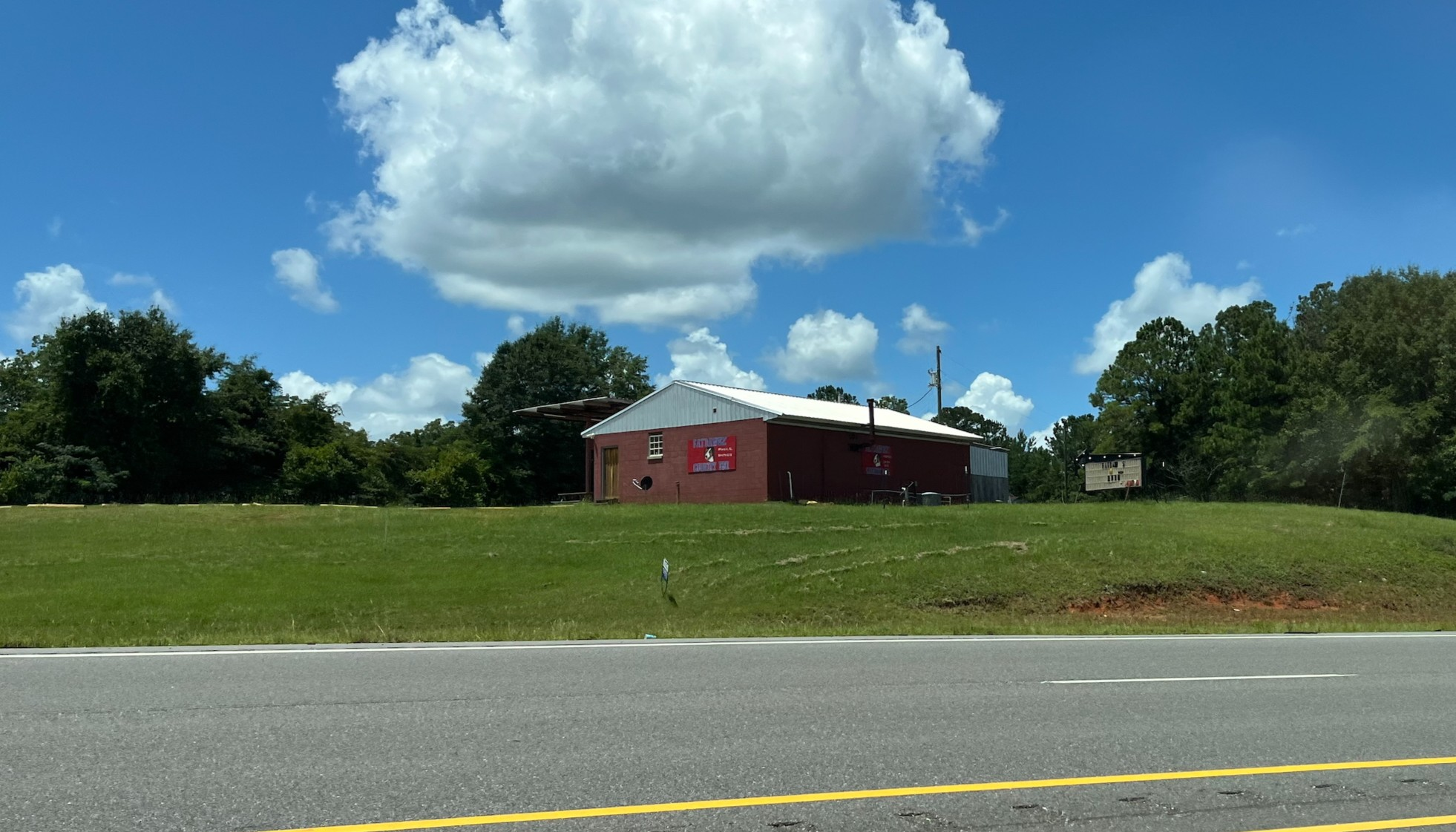
- Building in Shreve

- Location within Alabama Location within the United States
- Coordinates: 31°30′35″N 86°42′25″W
- Country: United States
- State: Alabama
- County: Conecuh
- Elevation: 374 ft (114 m)
- Time zone: UTC-6 (Central (CST))
  - Summer (DST): UTC-5 (CDT)
- Area code: 251
- GNIS feature ID: 157055

Shreve, also known as Rat, is an unincorporated community in Conecuh County, Alabama, United States.

== History ==
Shreve is most likely named after a local family.

A post office operated under the name Shreve from 1901 to 1933.
