= Hillcrest High School (Evergreen, Alabama) =

High school in Alabama, United States

Coordinates: 31°25′52″N 86°56′14″W

Location
- 1989 Jaguar Road; Evergreen, Conecuh County, Alabama 36401; United States

Information
- Type: Public
- Established: 1989 (37 years ago)
- CEEB code: 011030
- Principal: William Hines
- Teaching staff: 17.57 (on an FTE basis)
- Grades: 9-12
- Enrollment: 317 (2023–2024)
- Student to teacher ratio: 18.04
- Education system: Conecuh County School District
- Colors: Red , Black and White
- Mascot: Jaguars
- Website: hhs.conecuh.k12.al.us

Hillcrest High School is a school in Evergreen, Conecuh County, Alabama, United States.

Hillcrest combined four county high schools in 1989. Repton High School, Lyeffion High School, Conecuh County High School (Castleberry), and Evergreen High School.

Hillcrest also offers a multitude of extracurriculars. Hillcrest has an award-winning marching band. Hillcrest participates in 3A athletics under the AHSAA.

== Athletics ==
Hillcrest athletics has won three team state championships.

Basketball 2006 4A State Championship Football 2017 3A State Championship Basketball 2024 3A State Championship

Matt Likely owns the state sprinting records in 3A and 4A for track and field.

== Notable alumni ==
- Jacobee Bryant, NFL player
- Bob Meeks, former NFL player
