= Rabb, Alabama =

Unincorporated community in Brownsville, Alabama

- Unincorporated community
- Location within Alabama Location within the United States
- Coordinates: 31°26′21″N 86°52′50″W
- Country: United States
- State: Alabama
- County: Conecuh
- Elevation: 354 ft (108 m)
- Time zone: UTC-6 (Central (CST))
  - Summer (DST): UTC-5 (CDT)
- Area code: 251
- GNIS feature ID: 133173

Rabb is an unincorporated community in Conecuh County, Alabama, United States.

== History ==
Rabb was named for William Rabb, Sr., who settled in the area in 1819.

A post office operated under the name Rabb from 1898 to 1918.

The Rabb Rosenwald School, which is thought to be the last remaining Rosenwald school in Conecuh County, is listed on the Alabama Register of Landmarks and Heritage.
