= Mixonville, Alabama =

Unincorporated community in Brownsville, Alabama

- Unincorporated community
- Location within Alabama Location within the United States
- Coordinates: 31°25′18″N 86°56′55″W
- Country: United States
- State: Alabama
- County: Conecuh
- Elevation: 361 ft (110 m)
- Time zone: UTC-6 (Central (CST))
  - Summer (DST): UTC-5 (CDT)
- Area code: 251
- GNIS feature ID: 156722

Mixonville, also known as Annex, is an unincorporated community in Conecuh County, Alabama, United States.

A post office operated under the name Mixon from 1888 to 1892 and under the name Annex from 1898 to 1907.
