= WPNS (AM) =

- Destin, Florida; United States
- Broadcast area: Fort Walton Beach area
- Frequency: 1140 kHz

Programming
- Format: Silent

Ownership
- Owner: ANDALA ENTERPRISES INC.

History
- First air date: April 21, 1987 (as WWOU at 1120)
- Former call signs: WWOU (1987–1988); WBZR (1988–2003); WNWF (2003–2018)
- Former frequencies: 1120 kHz (1987–2017)

Technical information
- Licensing authority: FCC
- Facility ID: 72803
- Class: D
- Power: 3,000 watts day 12 watts night
- Transmitter coordinates: 30°30′36.20″N 86°28′39.40″W

Links
- Public license information: Public file; LMS

WPNS (1140 AM) is an American radio station licensed to serve Destin, Florida. As of March 21, 2020, the station has been silent.

== History ==
The station went on the air as WWOU on April 21, 1987. On December 15, 1988, the station changed its call sign to WBZR, and on November 1, 2003, to WNWF.

Tri-City purchased the station in February 2016 and the license transfer was official in May; Tri-City Radio, LLC had been LMA'ing the station since November 2015. (Alabama Broadcast Media Page)

On November 29, 2013, WNWF was granted a U.S. Federal Communications Commission (FCC) construction permit to move to 1140 kHz, increase day power to 3,000 watts, add critical hours operation with 2,400 watts and add night operation with 12 watts. A license to cover for their newly built facility was filed in December 2016, and was issued on December 19, 2017.

The station swapped call signs with Alabama-based radio station WPNS on December 21, 2018.

WPNS ceased broadcasting on March 21, 2020, due to financial reasons, as well as due to the COVID-19 emergency. WPNS must return to the air by March 22, 2021, or face deletion of its license.
