= Kelvin Davis (businessman) =

American businessman

Kelvin L. Davis (born c.1965) is an American businessman. A Stanford University and Harvard Business School graduate, he is a senior partner and Head of the North American Buyouts Group of the Texas Pacific Group, based in Fort Worth, Texas. He is a Member of the Board on numerous bodies and is an executive director at Metro-Goldwyn-Mayer film studios.
