= Golden Rule Bar-B-Q =

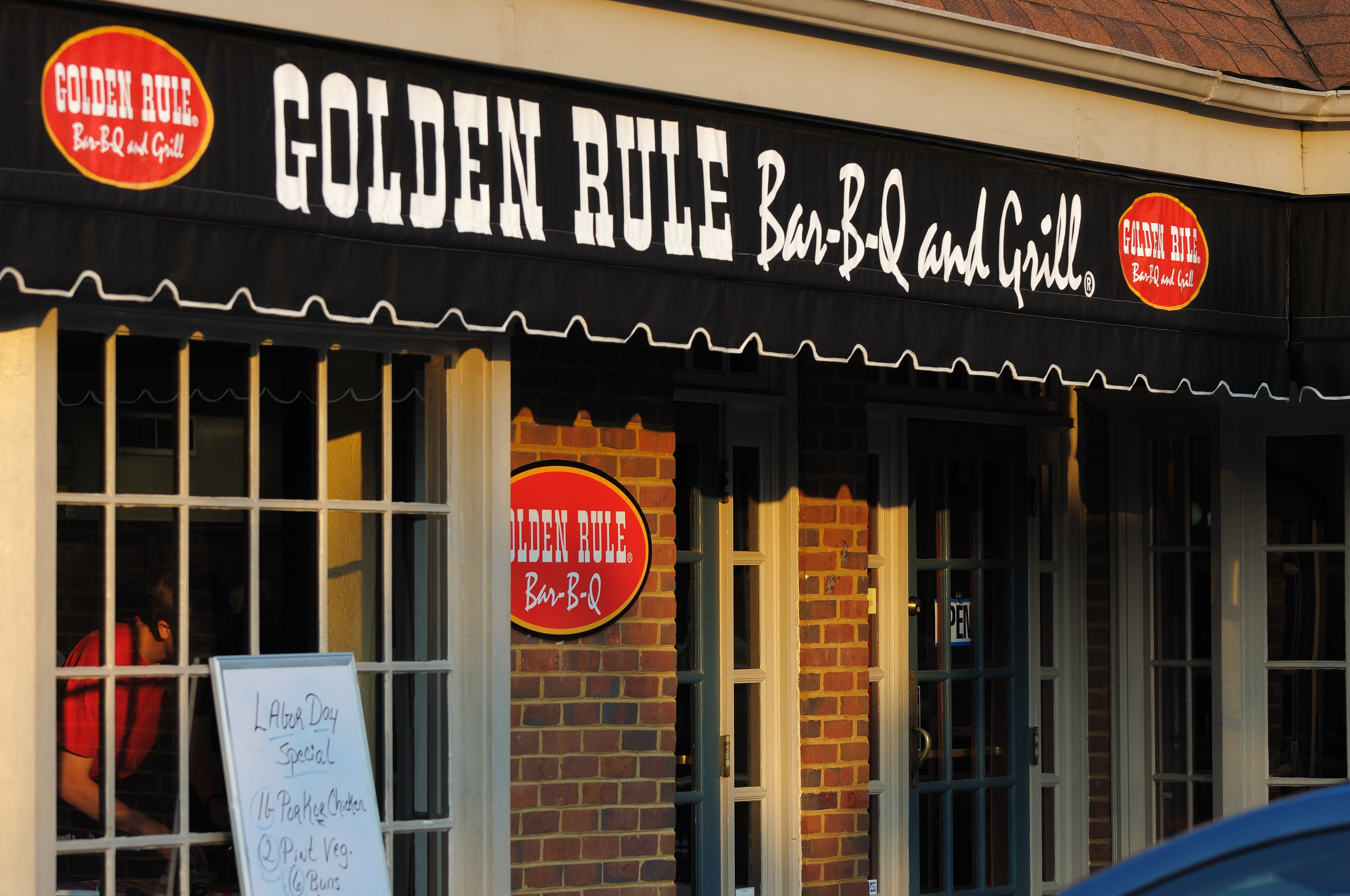
- Golden Rule BBQ in Crestline Village
- Interactive map of Golden Rule Bar-B-Q

Restaurant information
- Established: 1891; 135 years ago
- Owner: Brian Kemp
- Previous owner: Michael Matsos
- Manager: Daniel Harp is the director of Marketing
- Pastry chef: Aleesha Hoge
- Food type: Barbecue
- Rating: Oldest BBQ Joint in The USa
- Location: 2504 Crestwood Blvd, Irondale, Jefferson, Alabama, 35210, United States
- Coordinates: 33°32′11.5″N 86°41′49″W

Golden Rule Bar-B-Q is a barbecue restaurant in Alabama. It has been in continuous operation since 1891.

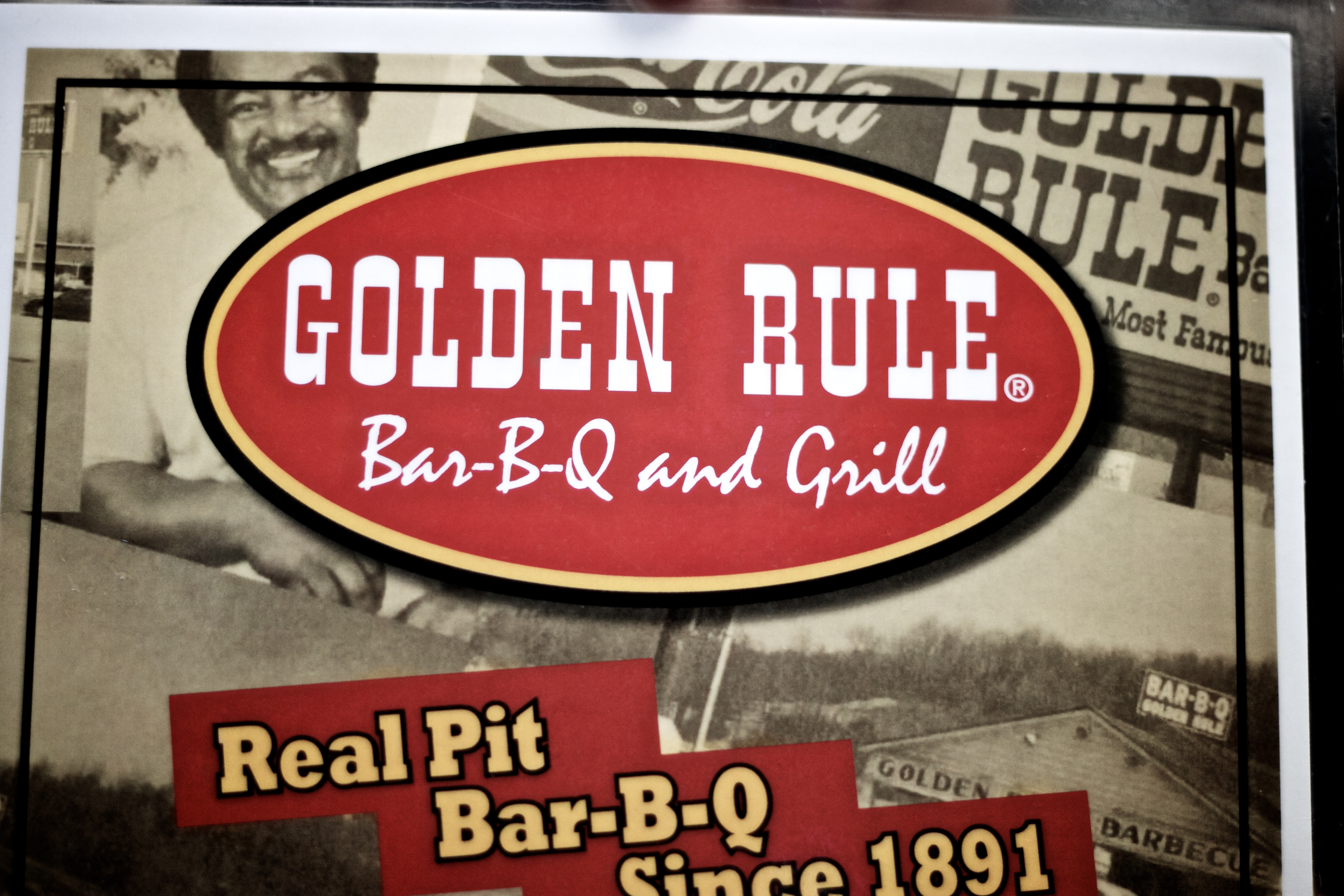
Golden Rule menu cover

== History ==
The first Golden Rule Bar-B-Q restaurant was founded in Irondale, Alabama by the Williams family in 1891. Located on a major dirt road, the restaurant originally catered to travelers. The original wood building had dirt floors, but it was later moved to a new location with a wood floored dining room. The restaurant served barbecue pork and other refreshments. The construction of U.S. Route 78 placed the restaurant on a major route between Birmingham, Alabama and Atlanta, Georgia. Because it served beer, it was popular with travellers who had to pass through dry counties on their way to Atlanta.

Ellene Williams married Jabo Stone in the 1930s, and they ran the restaurant together. The location was moved again in the 1960s when the highway was widened, and the new building had neon signs and a metal awning. The Williams-Stones had no children to inherit the business and eventually decided to sell the restaurant. In 1969, the restaurant was sold to Michael Matsos, a Greek American from Massachusetts who operated La Paree, a successful steakhouse in Birmingham. Jabo Stone had frequently visited Matsos' steakhouse, and Matsos in turn had enjoyed Stone's restaurant. Like with his other restaurants, Matsos hired Greek chefs and managers to help him run the restaurant.

Matsos expanded the restaurant's menu to include Coca-Cola, French fries and a green salad. He later moved the restaurant to a new location near the Interstate 20 in the 1970s.

As of 2007, the restaurant was being run by Michael's son Charles. It had 29 locations throughout Alabama in 2013. The restaurant was purchased by Brian Kemp in 2023. It is the oldest continuously operating restaurant in Alabama.
