= Encampment for Citizenship =

American youth socio-political engagement program

The Encampment for Citizenship (EFC) is a national non-profit, social justice organization based in California that offers year-round programming, including a residential summer leadership program. The Encampment joins youth from diverse racial, ethnic, socioeconomic, and regional backgrounds to form a self-governing community, learn to think critically about pressing social and political issues, and become empowered to take action. The EFC was founded in 1946 by Algernon D. Black, a leader of the New York Society for Ethical Culture, and Alice K. Pollitzer, a prominent civic leader. The program was sponsored by the American Ethical Union and its affiliated societies, in particular the New York Ethical Culture Society.

The EFC provides youth with opportunities to participate in activities related to democratic decision-making, with an emphasis on critical thinking and social action. Through these activities, participants learn about issues of our time and are encouraged to participate in civic and community activities.

The summer intensive is an immersion experience in participatory democracy where young people (ages 15–18) form a self-governing community and discuss social and political issues. The participants come from different geographic, economic, cultural and ethnic backgrounds. The purpose of the intensive is, beyond the social aspect, to foster a commitment to social justice activism.

The current EFC also offers year-round programming: a four-month follow-up program to support the Encampers in their action plans; and several online events for intergenerational dialogue.

The founders created the Encampment summer program for "young adults of many religious, racial, social and national backgrounds" to learn "the principles and techniques of citizenship in a liberal democracy through lived experience." Campers would establish their own camp government and be guided toward socio-political activism, a sense of civic responsibility, and volunteerism — all in a context of tolerance and diversity.

Eleanor Roosevelt, a long-time member of the society's board of directors, was an early supporter of the program and routinely hosted encampment workshops at her Hyde Park estate. When the program was attacked as "socialistic" by McCarthyite forces in the early 1950s, Roosevelt vigorously defended it. The Reverend Martin Luther King Jr. was a later supporter.

== Leadership ==
The organization has been led by several directors across its history. Bob Lubetsky served as executive director from 1976 to 1982. In the relaunched organization, Margot Gibney, an alumna of the 1971 Encampment, served as executive director and was later listed by the organization as a former executive director and board member. Dr. Faith R. Kares became executive director on January 1, 2026.

== Later history and relaunch ==
By 1996, more than 7,000 young people had participated in Encampment programs at sites across the United States and Puerto Rico. After a 16 year hiatus, alumni and former staff formed an association led by Ruth E. Thaler-Carter and Anne Klaeysen. The Encampment relaunched in 2013 with a two week pilot program in Richmond, Virginia. Virginia Commonwealth University Libraries also described the 2013 program as a relaunch of the summer youth program after more than ten years on hiatus.

== Pesticide-Free Soil Project ==
The Encampment sponsors the Pesticide-Free Soil Project, an environmental justice initiative in Ventura County, California. The project began in 2019 through collaboration among EFC alumni, local schools and community organizations, and developed from EFC's Environmental Justice Learning and Action Project. The project works with youth and community partners to address pesticide use near school campuses through environmental education, community events and youth organizing.

In the Rio School District, PFSP has been connected to school based Compost Tea Party events and environmental education programming. Rio School District identifies the Encampment for Citizenship as one of the collaborators involved in planning and facilitating the district's Compost Tea Party program.
