= Repton, Alabama =

- Town
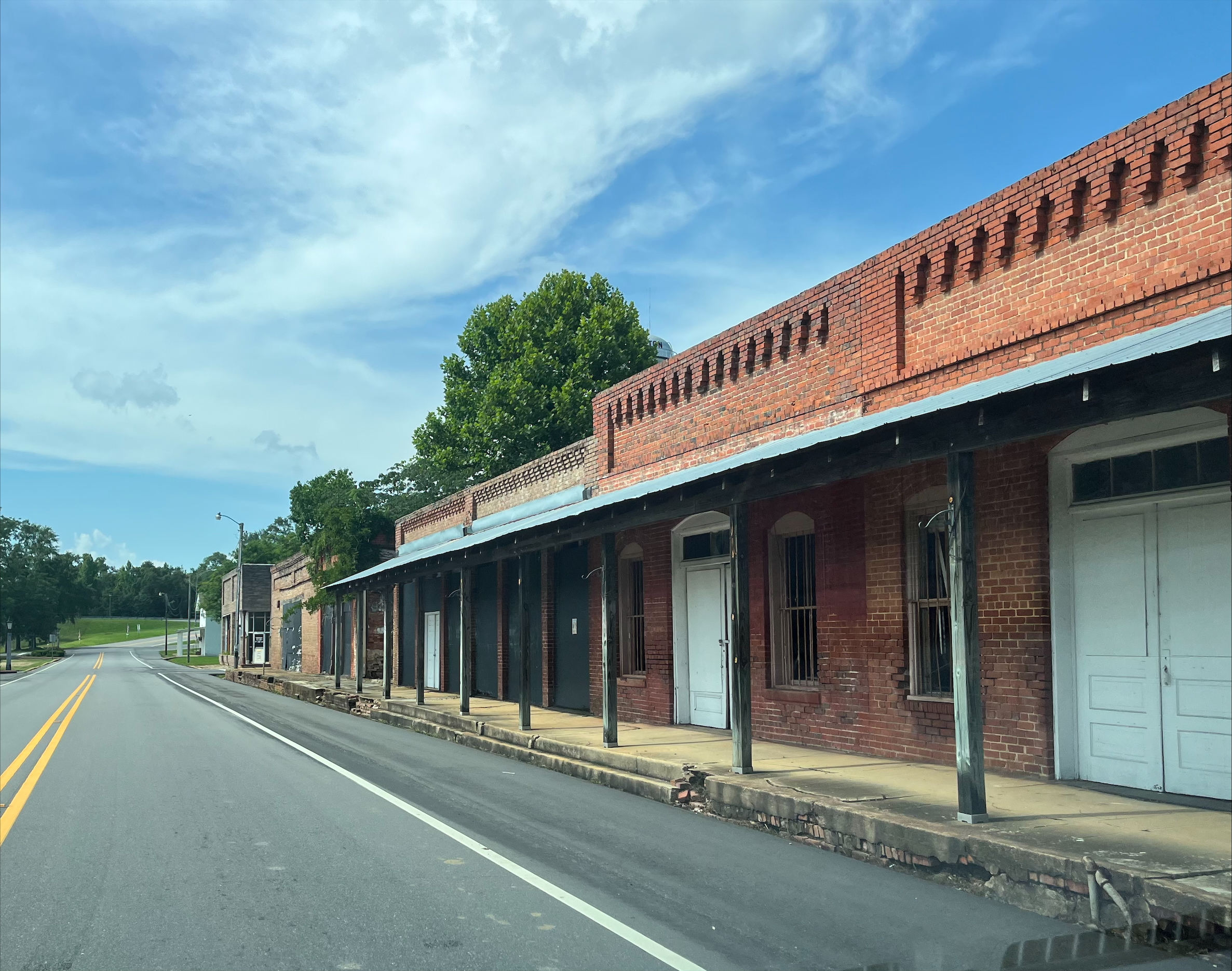
- Downtown Repton

- Location of Repton in Conecuh County, Alabama.
- Coordinates: 31°24′35″N 87°14′22″W
- Country: United States
- State: Alabama
- County: Conecuh

Area
  - Total: 0.97 sq mi (2.50 km^{2})
  - Land: 0.96 sq mi (2.48 km^{2})
  - Water: 0.0077 sq mi (0.02 km^{2})
- Elevation: 348 ft (106 m)

Population (2020)
  - Total: 235
  - Density: 245.5/sq mi (94.78/km^{2})
- Time zone: UTC-6 (Central (CST))
  - Summer (DST): UTC-5 (CDT)
- ZIP codes: 36454, 36475
- Area code: 251
- FIPS code: 01-64368
- GNIS feature ID: 2407200
- Website: www.reptonalabama.com

Repton is a town in Conecuh County, Alabama, United States. It was incorporated on January 10, 1899. At the 2020 census, the population was 235.

== History ==
A post office was founded under the name Repton in 1881. Repton is located on the former Louisville and Nashville Railroad. The town's name is derived from the surname of a railroad official. The community was once home to several stores, a hotel, bank, livery stable, cotton gin, and hospital.

== Geography ==
Repton is located in western Conecuh County.

According to the U.S. Census Bureau, the town has a total area of 0.97 square miles (2.5 km^{2}), of which 0.008 square miles (0.02 km^{2}), or 0.74%, is water.

== Demographics ==
Historical population
Census	Pop.	Note	%±
1900	170		—
1910	331		94.7%
1920	422		27.5%
1930	420		−0.5%
1940	365		−13.1%
1950	364		−0.3%
1960	314		−13.7%
1970	277		−11.8%
1980	313		13.0%
1990	293		−6.4%
2000	280		−4.4%
2010	282		0.7%
2020	235		−16.7%
U.S. Decennial Census; 2013 Estimate

As of the census of 2000, there were 280 people, 103 households, and 77 families residing in the town. The population density was 537.5 inhabitants per square mile (207.5/km^{2}). There were 129 housing units at an average density of 247.6 per square mile (95.6/km^{2}). The racial makeup of the town was 66.79% White, 31.79% Black or African American, 0.71% from other races, and 0.71% from two or more races. 0.71% of the population were Hispanic or Latino of any race.

There were 103 households, out of which 32.0% had children under the age of 18 living with them, 55.3% were married couples living together, 14.6% had a female householder with no husband present, and 25.2% were non-families. 23.3% of all households were made up of individuals, and 7.8% had someone living alone who was 65 years of age or older. The average household size was 2.72 and the average family size was 3.21.

In the town, the population was spread out, with 26.8% under the age of 18, 10.4% from 18 to 24, 25.4% from 25 to 44, 22.5% from 45 to 64, and 15.0% who were 65 years of age or older. The median age was 35 years. For every 100 females, there were 95.8 males. For every 100 females age 18 and over, there were 86.4 males.

The median income for a household in the town was $22,083, and the median income for a family was $28,281. Males had a median income of $29,583 versus $18,929 for females. The per capita income for the town was $12,469. About 15.6% of families and 16.7% of the population were below the poverty line, including 27.9% of those under the age of 18 and 16.9% of those 65 or over.

== Education ==
Repton Junior High School

== Notable person ==
- Annie Clo Watson, social worker
