= Conecuh County, Alabama =

County in Alabama, United States

- County
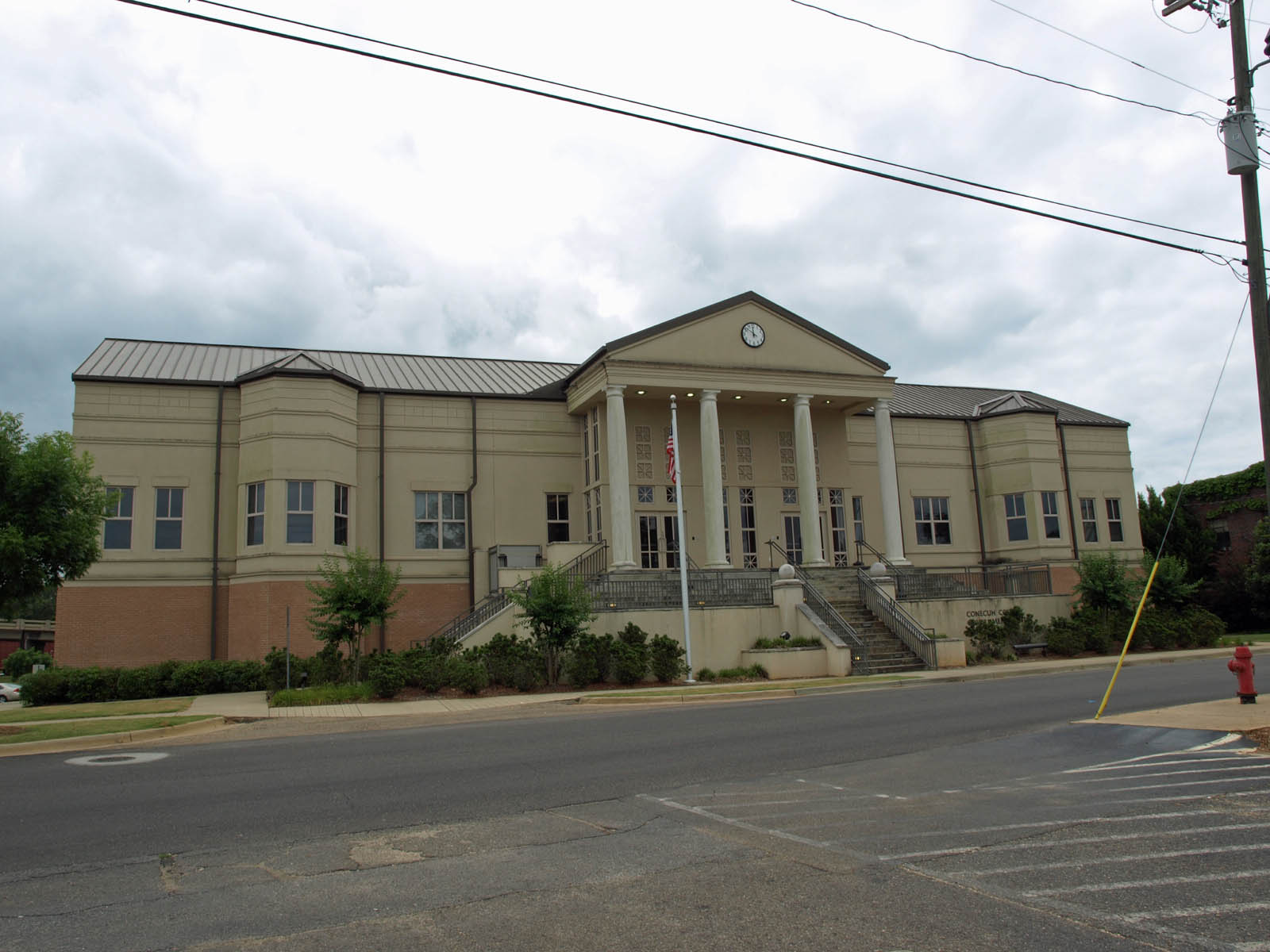
- The Conecuh County Government Center in Evergreen

- Seal

- Location within the U.S. state of Alabama
- Coordinates: 31°25′32″N 86°59′38″W
- Country: United States
- State: Alabama
- Founded: February 13, 1818
- Seat: Evergreen
- Largest city: Evergreen

Area
  - Total: 853 sq mi (2,210 km^{2})
  - Land: 850 sq mi (2,200 km^{2})
  - Water: 2.6 sq mi (6.7 km^{2}) 0.3%

Population (2020)
  - Total: 11,597
  - Estimate (2025): 10,899 ▼
  - Density: 14/sq mi (5.3/km^{2})
- Time zone: UTC−6 (Central)
  - Summer (DST): UTC−5 (CDT)
- Congressional district: 2nd
- Website: www.conecuhcounty.us
- County Number 21 on Alabama Licence Plates

Conecuh County (/kəˈnɛkə/) is a county located in the south-central portion of the U.S. state of Alabama. As of the 2020 census the population was 11,597. Its county seat is Evergreen. Its name is believed to be derived from a Creek Indian term meaning "land of cane."

== History ==
The areas along the rivers had been used by varying cultures of indigenous peoples for thousands of years. French and Spanish explorers encountered the historic Creek Indians. Later, British colonial traders developed relationships with the Creek and several married high-status Creek women. As the tribe has a matrilineal system, children are considered born into their mother's clan and take their status from her family.

During the American Revolutionary War, the Upper Creek chief Alexander McGillivray, whose father was Scottish, allied his tribe with the British, hoping they could stop colonial Americans from encroaching on Creek land. Commissioned a British colonel, McGillivray named Jean-Antoine Le Clerc, a French adventurer who lived with the Creeks for 20 years, as the war chief to lead the Creek warriors.

Conecuh County was established by Alabama on February 13, 1818. Some of its territory was taken in 1868 by the Republican state legislature during the Reconstruction era to establish Escambia County. Located in the coastal plain, 19th century Conecuh County was an area of plantations and cotton cultivation, and it is still quite rural today. Thousands of African American residents left in the 1940s, during the Second Great Migration, mostly for industrial regions in the major cities.

In September 1979, the county was declared a disaster area, due to damage caused by Hurricane Frederic.

Conecuh County was mentioned as the birthplace of Theodore Bagwell in the television series Prison Break.

== Geography ==
According to the United States Census Bureau, the county has a total area of 853 square miles (2,210 km^{2}), of which 850 square miles (2,200 km^{2}) is land and 2.6 square miles (6.7 km^{2}) (0.3%) is water.

=== Major highways ===
- Interstate 65
- U.S. Highway 31 / State Route 3 (unsigned)
- U.S. Highway 84 / State Route 12 (unsigned)
- State Route 41
- State Route 83

=== Adjacent counties ===
- Butler County (northeast)
- Covington County (southeast)
- Escambia County (south)
- Monroe County (northwest)

== Sausage ==
Known as "The Sausage of the South", Conecuh County is also known as the birthplace of Conecuh sausage. In the days before most had freezers, a man named Henry Sessions formulated his recipe for hickory smoked pork sausage. After returning from World War II, Sessions worked as a salesman for a meatpacking plant in Montgomery, Alabama. He started Sessions Quick Freeze in Evergreen in 1947 so that people could bring their pigs and cattle, have them slaughtered, and store them and their vegetables in his rentable meat locker. But it was Sessions' high-quality smoked pork sausage that put his company on the map. Customer demand for the sausage made the family butcher 250 hogs a week to satisfy these cravings. Today the 100-employee company makes 35,000- 40,000 pounds of sausage a week.

== Demographics ==
Historical population
Census	Pop.	Note	%±
1820	5,713		—
1830	7,444		30.3%
1840	8,197		10.1%
1850	9,322		13.7%
1860	11,311		21.3%
1870	9,574		−15.4%
1880	12,605		31.7%
1890	14,594		15.8%
1900	17,514		20.0%
1910	21,433		22.4%
1920	24,593		14.7%
1930	25,429		3.4%
1940	25,489		0.2%
1950	21,776		−14.6%
1960	17,762		−18.4%
1970	15,645		−11.9%
1980	15,884		1.5%
1990	14,054		−11.5%
2000	14,089		0.2%
2010	13,228		−6.1%
2020	11,597		−12.3%
2025 (est.)	10,899	▼	−6.0%
U.S. Decennial Census; 1790–1960 1900–1990; 1990–2000 2010–2020

=== Racial and ethnic composition ===
Conecuh County, Alabama – Racial and ethnic composition Note: the US Census treats Hispanic/Latino as an ethnic category. This table excludes Latinos from the racial categories and assigns them to a separate category. Hispanics/Latinos may be of any race.
Race / Ethnicity (NH = Non-Hispanic)	Pop 2000	Pop 2010	Pop 2020	% 2000	% 2010	% 2020
White alone (NH)	7,760	6,764	5,835	55.08%	51.13%	50.31%
Black or African American alone (NH)	6,091	6,122	5,096	43.23%	46.28%	43.94%
Native American or Alaska Native alone (NH)	27	44	71	0.19%	0.33%	0.61%
Asian alone (NH)	16	17	33	0.11%	0.13%	0.28%
Pacific Islander alone (NH)	5	0	0	0.04%	0.00%	0.00%
Other race alone (NH)	6	6	16	0.04%	0.05%	0.14%
Mixed race or Multiracial (NH)	82	114	290	0.58%	0.86%	2.50%
Hispanic or Latino (any race)	102	161	256	0.72%	1.22%	2.21%
Total	14,089	13,228	11,597	100.00%	100.00%	100.00%

=== 2020 census ===
As of the 2020 census, the county had a population of 11,597. The median age was 46.8 years. 20.0% of residents were under the age of 18 and 23.1% of residents were 65 years of age or older. For every 100 females there were 92.6 males, and for every 100 females age 18 and over there were 90.2 males age 18 and over.

The racial makeup of the county was 51.0% White, 44.0% Black or African American, 0.6% American Indian and Alaska Native, 0.3% Asian, 0.0% Native Hawaiian and Pacific Islander, 0.9% from some other race, and 3.2% from two or more races. Hispanic or Latino residents of any race comprised 2.2% of the population.

0.0% of residents lived in urban areas, while 100.0% lived in rural areas.

There were 5,066 households in the county, of which 26.7% had children under the age of 18 living with them and 35.7% had a female householder with no spouse or partner present. About 34.6% of all households were made up of individuals and 16.2% had someone living alone who was 65 years of age or older.

There were 6,382 housing units, of which 20.6% were vacant. Among occupied housing units, 73.8% were owner-occupied and 26.2% were renter-occupied. The homeowner vacancy rate was 1.9% and the rental vacancy rate was 10.6%.

=== 2010 ===
According to the 2010 United States census:

- 51.3% White
- 46.5% Black
- 0.3% Native American
- 0.1% Asian
- 0.0% Native Hawaiian or Pacific Islander
- 1.0% Two or more races
- 1.2% Hispanic or Latino (of any race)

=== 2000 ===
As of the census of 2000, there were 14,089 people, 5,792 households, and 3,938 families residing in the county. The population density was 17 people per square mile (6.6 people/km^{2}). There were 7,265 housing units at an average density of 8 units per square mile (3.1 units/km^{2}). The racial makeup of the county was 55.40% White, 43.55% Black or African American, 0.20% Native American, 0.11% Asian, 0.05% Pacific Islander, 0.09% from other races, and 0.60% from two or more races. 0.72% of the population were Hispanic or Latino of any race.

There were 5,792 households, out of which 30.90% had children under the age of 18 living with them, 47.70% were married couples living together, 16.20% had a female householder with no husband present, and 32.00% were non-families. 30.10% of all households were made up of individuals, and 13.50% had someone living alone who was 65 years of age or older. The average household size was 2.42 and the average family size was 3.01.

In the county, the population was spread out, with 25.90% under the age of 18, 8.30% from 18 to 24, 25.80% from 25 to 44, 24.30% from 45 to 64, and 15.80% who were 65 years of age or older. The median age was 38 years. For every 100 females there were 89.80 males. For every 100 females age 18 and over, there were 84.30 males.

The median income for a household in the county was $22,111, and the median income for a family was $31,424. Males had a median income of $28,115 versus $19,350 for females. The per capita income for the county was $12,964. About 21.70% of families and 26.60% of the population were below the poverty line, including 36.10% of those under age 18 and 28.90% of those age 65 or over.

== Politics ==
Conecuh County is a swing county in presidential elections.

United States presidential election results for Conecuh County, Alabama
Year	Republican		Democratic		Third party(ies)	
Year	No.	%	No.	%	No.	%
1824	83	27.95%	200	67.34%	14	4.71%
1832	0	0.00%	200	100.00%	0	0.00%
1836	285	76.41%	88	23.59%	0	0.00%
1840	541	72.23%	208	27.77%	0	0.00%
1844	441	61.42%	277	38.58%	0	0.00%
1848	426	64.84%	231	35.16%	0	0.00%
1852	216	41.70%	287	55.41%	15	2.90%
1856	0	0.00%	425	51.02%	408	48.98%
1860	0	0.00%	205	22.75%	696	77.25%
1868	843	48.48%	896	51.52%	0	0.00%
1872	951	51.32%	902	48.68%	0	0.00%
1876	777	39.93%	1,169	60.07%	0	0.00%
1880	843	42.21%	1,154	57.79%	0	0.00%
1884	972	48.38%	1,036	51.57%	1	0.05%
1888	748	35.70%	1,347	64.30%	0	0.00%
1892	0	0.00%	877	35.01%	1,628	64.99%
1896	881	43.87%	931	46.36%	196	9.76%
1900	803	48.17%	718	43.07%	146	8.76%
1904	106	12.25%	739	85.43%	20	2.31%
1908	111	13.94%	651	81.78%	34	4.27%
1912	60	6.05%	802	80.93%	129	13.02%
1916	42	3.83%	1,036	94.44%	19	1.73%
1920	189	12.57%	1,315	87.43%	0	0.00%
1924	92	8.49%	955	88.10%	37	3.41%
1928	1,113	56.47%	858	43.53%	0	0.00%
1932	114	5.09%	2,125	94.91%	0	0.00%
1936	89	3.88%	2,195	95.60%	12	0.52%
1940	50	2.08%	2,345	97.71%	5	0.21%
1944	127	7.74%	1,498	91.34%	15	0.91%
1948	64	4.54%	0	0.00%	1,345	95.46%
1952	749	30.47%	1,678	68.27%	31	1.26%
1956	885	32.14%	1,687	61.26%	182	6.61%
1960	650	25.84%	1,815	72.17%	50	1.99%
1964	2,782	81.32%	0	0.00%	639	18.68%
1968	186	3.48%	1,151	21.53%	4,009	74.99%
1972	3,214	74.81%	1,042	24.26%	40	0.93%
1976	1,812	36.39%	3,086	61.97%	82	1.65%
1980	2,948	47.69%	3,102	50.19%	131	2.12%
1984	3,538	55.86%	2,735	43.18%	61	0.96%
1988	3,256	51.22%	3,022	47.54%	79	1.24%
1992	2,463	39.05%	3,155	50.02%	689	10.92%
1996	2,093	38.33%	2,903	53.16%	465	8.51%
2000	2,699	48.62%	2,783	50.14%	69	1.24%
2004	3,271	54.33%	2,719	45.16%	31	0.51%
2008	3,470	49.98%	3,429	49.39%	44	0.63%
2012	3,439	48.95%	3,555	50.60%	31	0.44%
2016	3,420	51.94%	3,080	46.77%	85	1.29%
2020	3,442	53.44%	2,966	46.05%	33	0.51%
2024	3,423	56.57%	2,580	42.64%	48	0.79%

United States Senate election results for Conecuh County, Alabama2
Year	Republican		Democratic		Third party(ies)	
Year	No.	%	No.	%	No.	%
2020	3,294	51.50%	3,098	48.44%	4	0.06%

United States Senate election results for Conecuh County, Alabama3
Year	Republican		Democratic		Third party(ies)	
Year	No.	%	No.	%	No.	%
2022	2,564	57.81%	1,830	41.26%	41	0.92%

Alabama Gubernatorial election results for Conecuh County
Year	Republican		Democratic		Third party(ies)	
Year	No.	%	No.	%	No.	%
2022	2,618	58.48%	1,782	39.80%	77	1.72%

== Communities ==
=== City ===
- Evergreen (county seat)

=== Towns ===
- Castleberry
- McKenzie (partly in Butler County)
- Repton

=== Unincorporated communities ===
- Belleville
- Bermuda
- Brooklyn
- Centerville
- Cohassett
- Johnsonville
- Lenox
- Loree
- Lyeffion
- Mixonville
- Nymph
- Paul
- Rabb
- Range
- Shreve
- Skinnerton
- Spring Hill

== Historic sites ==
Conecuh County has three sites listed on the National Register of Historic Places, the Asa Johnston Farmhouse, Louisville and Nashville Depot, and New Evergreen Commercial Historic District.

== See also ==
- Conecuh County School District
- National Register of Historic Places listings in Conecuh County, Alabama
- Properties on the Alabama Register of Landmarks and Heritage in Conecuh County, Alabama
