= Order of His Majesty Sultan Qaboos bin Said =

Omani order

Order of His Majesty Sultan Qaboos bin Said وسام صاحب الجلالة السلطان قابوس بن سعيد المعظم

Awarded by Sultan of Oman
- Type: State
- Established: 1978
- Country: Oman
- Royal house: Al Bu Sa'id
- Status: Dormant
- Founder: Sultan Qaboos bin Said
- Sovereign: Sultan Haitham bin Tariq

Precedence
- Next (higher): Order of Royal Commendation
- Next (lower): Order of the Renaissance
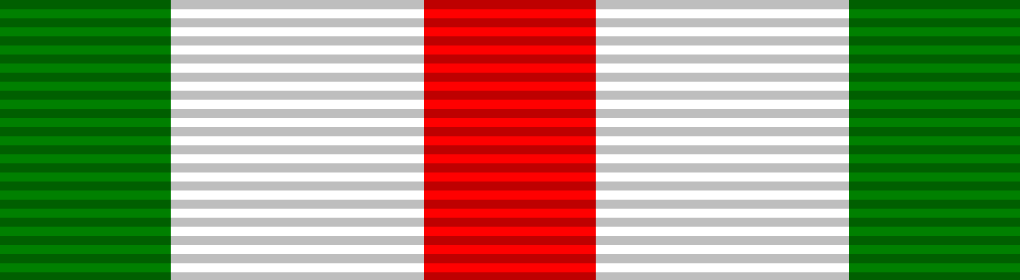
- Ribbon bar of the order

The Order of His Majesty Sultan Qaboos bin Said (Arabic: وسام صاحب الجلالة السلطان قابوس بن سعيد المعظم, romanized: Wisam Sahib al-Jalalat al-Sultan Qaboos bin Said) is an order of Oman. It is sometimes called the "Order of Merit of Sultan Qaboos" in English.

== History ==
The order was instituted in a single class in 1978 by Sultan Qaboos bin Said. The only known awards of the order were made in 1983 and it appears to be in disuse.

== Insignia ==
The insignia was created by Asprey. The ribbon is white with a central red stripe and green borders. It is worn around the neck for men and as a bow for women. Both versions have the same badge with a portrait of Sultan Qaboos bin Said surrounded by a row of diamonds and a row of green enamel.

== Notable Recipients ==
- Abdullah bin Sakhr al Ameri (1983)
- Ahmed Mohammad al Wadidi (1983)
- Musallam bin Ali bin Abdul Karim (1983)
- Samira Mohammad Amin (1983)
- Yusuf Mohammad Abdul Salam (1983)
