= Order of Royal Commendation =

Omani order

Order of Royal Commendation وسام الإشادة السلطانية

Awarded by Sultan of Oman
- Type: State
- Established: 2007
- Country: Oman
- Royal house: Al Bu Sa'id
- Status: Currently constituted
- Founder: Sultan Qaboos bin Said
- Sovereign: Sultan Haitham bin Tariq
- Classes: 1st to 3rd Class

Precedence
- Next (higher): Order of Sultan Qaboos
- Next (lower): Order of His Majesty Sultan Qaboos bin Said
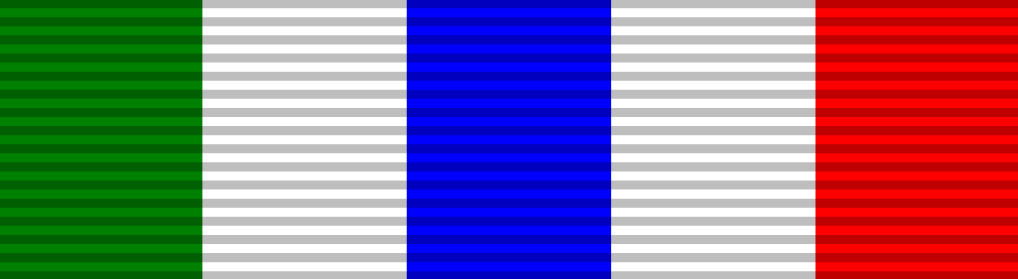
- Ribbon bar of the order

The Order of Royal Commendation (Arabic: وسام الإشادة السلطانية, romanized: Wisam al-Iishadat al-Sultania) is an order of Oman.

== History ==
The order was established by Sultan Qaboos bin Said in July 2007 in the aftermath of Cyclone Gonu. It has three classes.

== Insignia ==
Crown of Oman

The insignia of the first and second classes consists of the neck ribbon, badge, and star while the third class only has the neck ribbon and badge. The ribbon is white with colored stripes; green on the left, blue in the center, and red on the right. The badge and star are an eight pointed star with blue points and white pearl tipped points between each main blue point. The center features the crown of Oman on a green background surrounded by a blue band. The blue and white areas of the first class stars are set with sapphires and diamonds instead of enamel.

== Notable recipients ==
=== First class ===
- Majid Mohammed Al Futtaim (2018)
- Mohammed bin Ali al Alawi (2024)

=== Second class ===
- Dr. Fatma bint Mohammed al-Ajmi (2020)
- Sabah Ahmed al Sulaiman (2022)
- Dr Abdullah Mohammed al Sa’adi (2022)
- Khalifa Saif al Jabri (2022)
- Sheikh Suhail Salim al Mukhaini (2022)
- Dr Mohammed Ali al Barwani (2022)
- Saleh Mohammed al Shanfari (2022)
- Hareb Abdullah al Kitani (2022)
- Hunaina Sultan al Mughairy (2022)
- Sheikh Hamoud bin Hamid bin Hamad Al-Sawafi (2023)
- Maryam bint Issa Al Zadjali (2023)
- Dr. Abdullah bin Hamad bin Suwaid Al-Badi (2023)
- Dr. Samir bin Hamad bin Nasser Al-Adawi (2023)
- Sheikh Mohammed bin Saud bin Salem Al-Mukhaini (2023)
- Shawqi bin Abdul Reda Sultan (2023)
- Dr. Salem bin Sultan bin Salem Al-Ruzaiqi (2023)
- Majid bin Fail bin Salem Al Ameri (2023)
- Adnan bin Ahmed bin Hamad Al Shuaili (2023)
- Dr. Saif bin Salem bin Saif Al-Abri (2023)
- Dr. Ali bin Mahad bin Muslim Al-Ma’ashani (2023)
- Sumaya bint Saeed bin Suleiman Al-Siyabiya (2023)
- Dr. Khalid Humaid Al Rassadi (2024)
- Dr. Qassim Saleh Al Abri (2024)
- Dr. Ahmed Suleiman Al Harrasi (2024)
- Dr. Suleiman Mohammed Al Balushi (2024)
- Dr. Mohammed Hamdan Al Badi (2024)
- Dr. Jokha Mohammed Al Harthi (2024)
- Zahran Hamdan Al Qasmi (2024)
- Haitham Khamis Al Farsi (2024)
- Ahmed Said Al Harthi (2024)
- Mohammed Jameel Al Mashaikhi (2024)
- Razan Hamad Al Kalbani (2024)
- Said Hamdan Al Muqaimi (2024)
- Abdul-Salam Issa Al Rawahi (2024)

=== Third class ===
- Aisha bint Omar bin Ahmed al-Habshi (2020)
- Farida bint Moosa bin Juma al-Balushi (2020)
- Zahra bint Salim al-Aufi (2020)
- Yusra bint Khalaf bin Sulaiman al-Subhi (2020)
