= Sash =

Band of fabric worn on the body

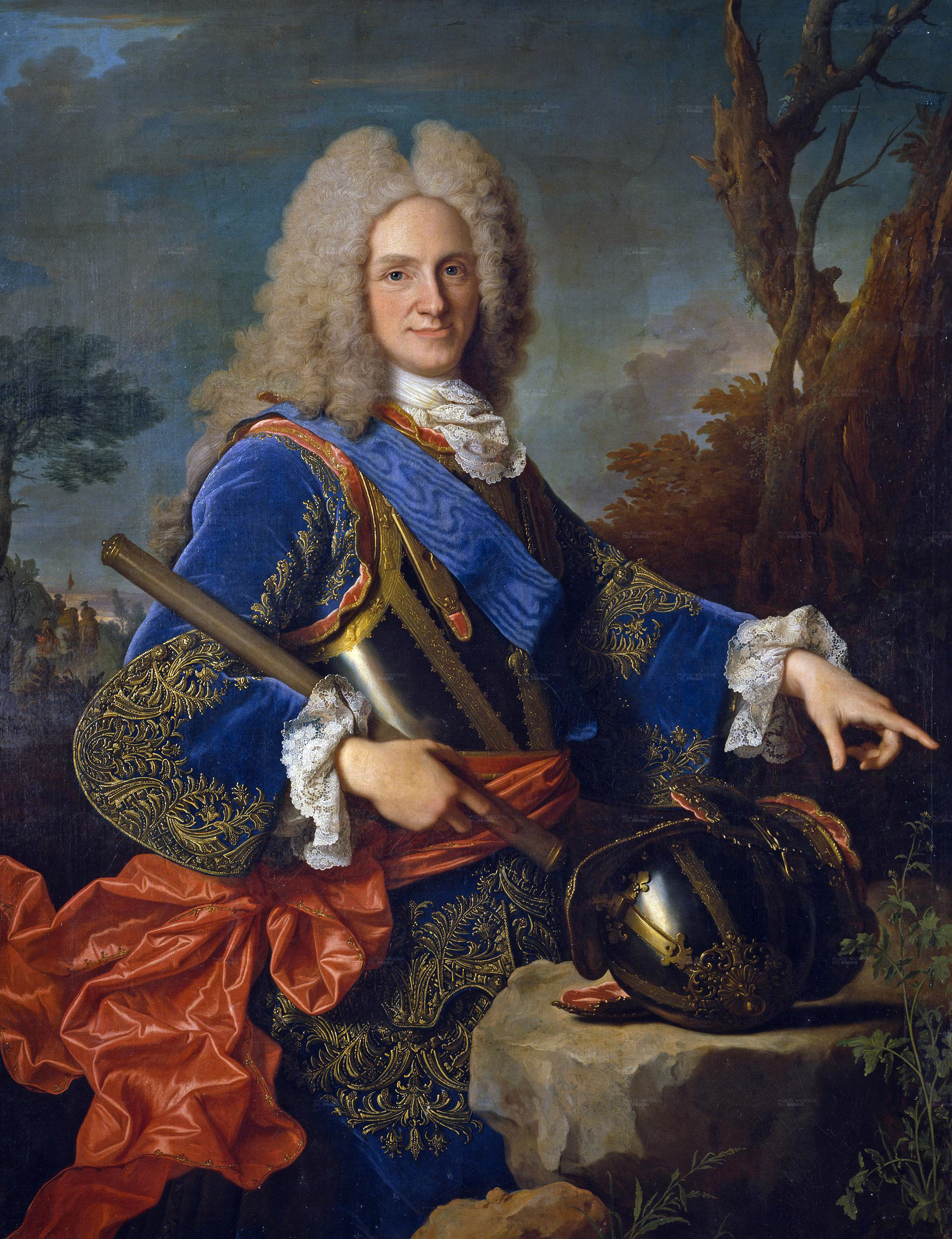
Philip V, King of Spain wearing two types of sash: a red waist sash and the blue sash (Cordon Bleu) of the Order of the Holy Spirit

A sash is a large and usually colorful ribbon or band of material worn around the human body, either draping from one shoulder to the opposing hip and back up, or else encircling the waist. The sash around the waist may be worn in daily attire, but the sash from shoulder to hip is typically only worn on ceremonial occasions. Ceremonial sashes are also found in a V-shaped format, draping straight from both shoulders down, intersecting and forming an angle over the chest or abdomen.

== Word origin ==
The word "sash" entered the English language in the 1590s, originally used to refer to a way of "Oriental dress" by winding a strip of silk or fine linen around the head to look like a turban. It comes from Arabic word shash (شاش) which means gauze or muslin cloth. An archaic version of the English word was a perfect homonym of the Arabic. The more general use of "sash" to refer to a cloth strip or scarf tied around the waist or draped over the shoulder for ornamental purposes is recorded by the 1680s.

== Military use ==
=== Old Europe ===
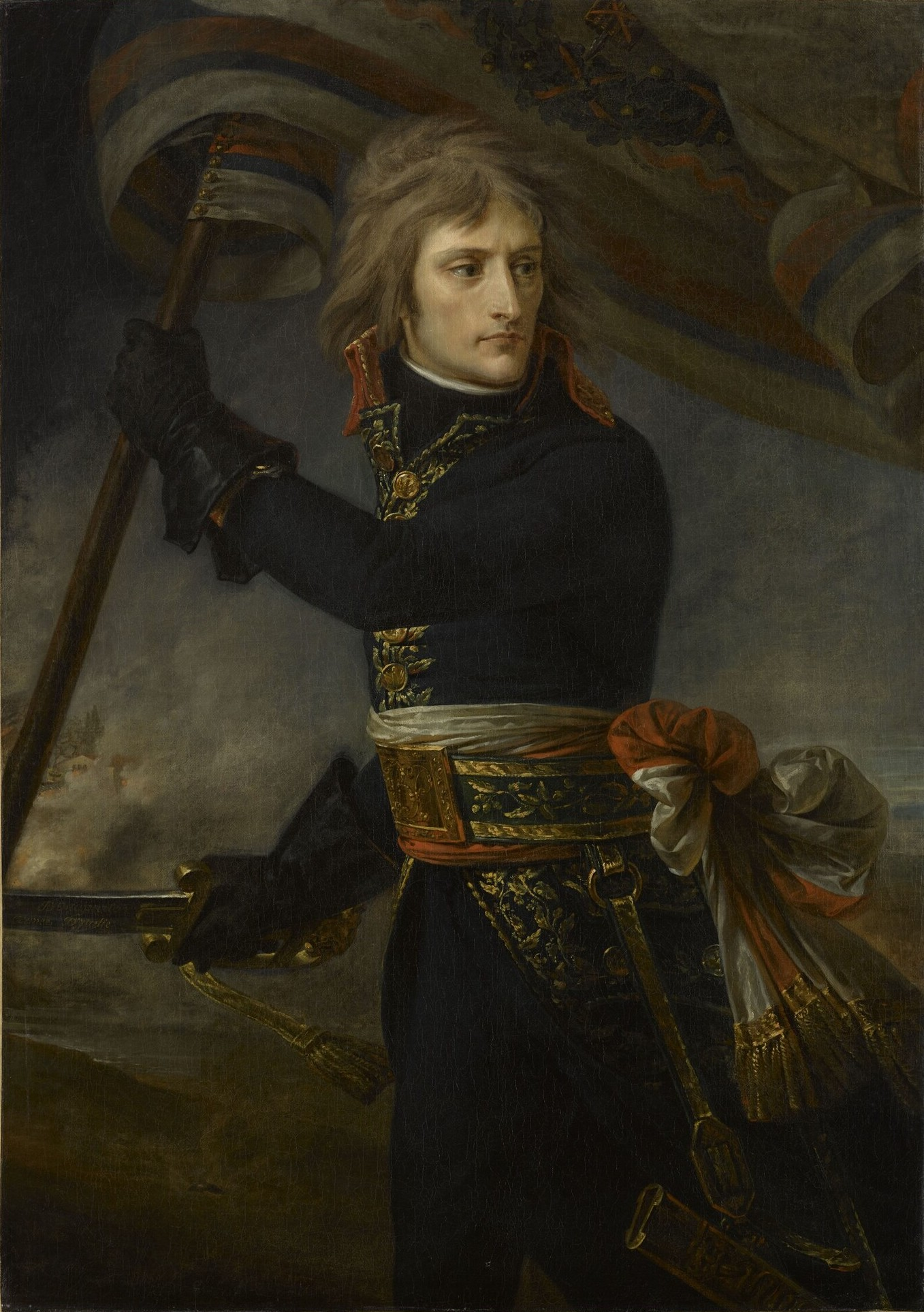
Bonaparte at the Pont d'Arcole, a 1796 portrait of Napoleon by Antoine-Jean Gros depicting him wearing a sash

In the mid-and late-16th century waist and shoulder sashes came up as a mark of (high) military rank or to show personal affection to a political party or nation. During the Thirty Years' War the distinctive sash colour of the House of Habsburg was red while their French opponents wore white or blue sashes and the Swedish voted for blue sashes.

Beginning from the end of the 17th century, commissioned officers in the British Army wore waist sashes of crimson silk. The original officer's sash was six inches wide by eighty-eight inches long with a ten-inch (gold or silver) fringe. It was large enough to form a hammock stretcher to carry a wounded officer. From about 1730 to 1768, the officer's sash was worn baudericke wise, i.e. from the right shoulder to the left hip, and afterwards around the waist again.

Sergeants were permitted sashes of crimson wool, with a single stripe of facing colour following the clothing regulations of 1727. Whereas it remained vague whether the sash was to be worn over the shoulder or around the waist, it was clarified in 1747 that sergeants had to wear their sashes around the waist. From 1768, the sergeant's waist sash had one (until 1825) resp. three (until 1845) stripes of facing colour; in regiments with red or purple facings the sergeant's sash had white stripes or remained plain crimson.

Until 1914 waist-sashes in distinctive national colours were worn as a peace-time mark of rank by officers of the Imperial German, Austro-Hungarian and Russian armies, amongst others.

The barrel sash is a type of belt traditionally worn by hussars.

=== Modern Europe ===
Since then sashes have been part of formal military attire (compare the sword belt known as a baldric, and the cummerbund). Thus several other modern armies retain waist-sashes for wear by officers in ceremonial uniforms. These include the armies of Norway (crimson sashes), Sweden (yellow and blue), Greece (light blue and white), the Netherlands (orange), Portugal (crimson) and Spain (red and gold for generals, light blue for general staff and crimson for infantry officers).

The Spanish Regulares (infantry descended from colonial regiments formerly recruited in Spanish Morocco) retain their historic waist-sashes for all ranks in colours that vary according to the unit.

Sashes are a distinctive feature of some regiments of the modern French Army for parade dress. They are worn around the waist in the old Algerian or Zouave style ("ceinture de laine"). Traditionally these sashes were more than 4 m (13 ft) in length and 40 cm (16 in) in width. In the historic French Army of Africa, sashes were worn around the waist in either blue for European or red for indigenous troops.

=== (British) Commonwealth of Nations ===
The modern British Army retains a scarlet sash for wear in certain orders of dress by sergeants and above serving in infantry regiments, over the right shoulder to the left hip. A similar crimson silk net sash is worn around the waist by officers of the Foot Guards in scarlet full dress and officers of line infantry in dark blue "Number 1" dress. Additionally, officers (and warrant officers prior to the amalgamation) of the Royal Regiment of Scotland wear a crimson sash from the left shoulder to the right hip. These same practices are followed in some Commonwealth armies.

The present-day armies of India and Pakistan both make extensive use of waist-sashes for ceremonial wear. The colours vary widely according to regiment or branch and match those of the turbans where worn. Typically two or more colours are incorporated in the sash, in vertical stripes. One end hangs loose at the side and may have an ornamental fringe. The practice of wearing distinctive regimental sashes or cummerbunds goes back to the late nineteenth century.

Cross-belts resembling sashes are worn by drum majors in the Dutch, British and some Commonwealth armies. These carry scrolls bearing the names of battle honours.

=== United States of America ===
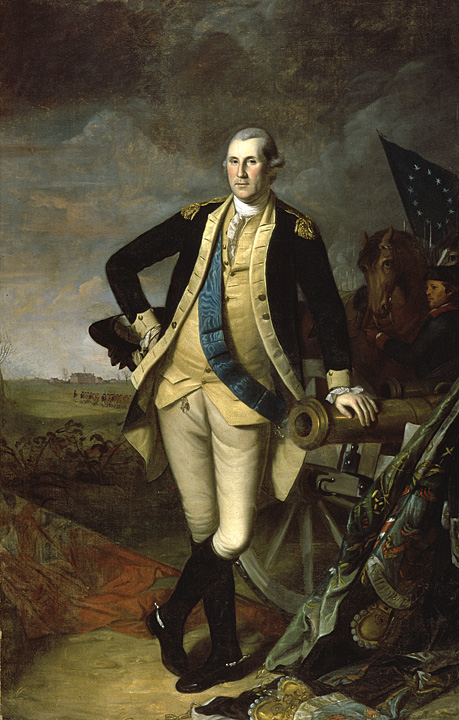
Washington at Princeton by Charles Willson Peale (1779)

In the United States, George Washington, who served as commander-in-chief of the Continental Army during the American Revolutionary War and later served as the first President of the United States, was noted for wearing a blue ribbed sash, similar to that of the British Order of the Garter, early in the war, as he had in 1775 prescribed the use of green, pink, and blue sashes to identify aides de camp, brigade-majors, brigadiers general, majors general, and the commander in chief in the absence of formal uniforms. He later gave up the sash as "unrepublican" and "pretentious for all but the highest-ranking aristocracy", according to historians. Washington is seen wearing the sash in Charles Willson Peale's 1779 painting Washington at Princeton.

Sashes continued to be used in the United States Army for sergeants and officers. In 1821, the red sashes (crimson for officers) were limited to first sergeants and above. In 1872, the sashes were abolished by all ranks, but generals continued to wear their buff silk sashes in full dress until 1917. Waist sashes (in combination with a sabre) in the old style are still worn by the officers and senior NCOs of the Commander-in-Chief's Guard of the 3rd U.S. Infantry Regiment (The Old Guard) as well by the West Point Band drum major along with the West Point cadet officers. The drum major of the Old Guard Fife and Drum Corps also still wears a waist sash, but no sidearms.

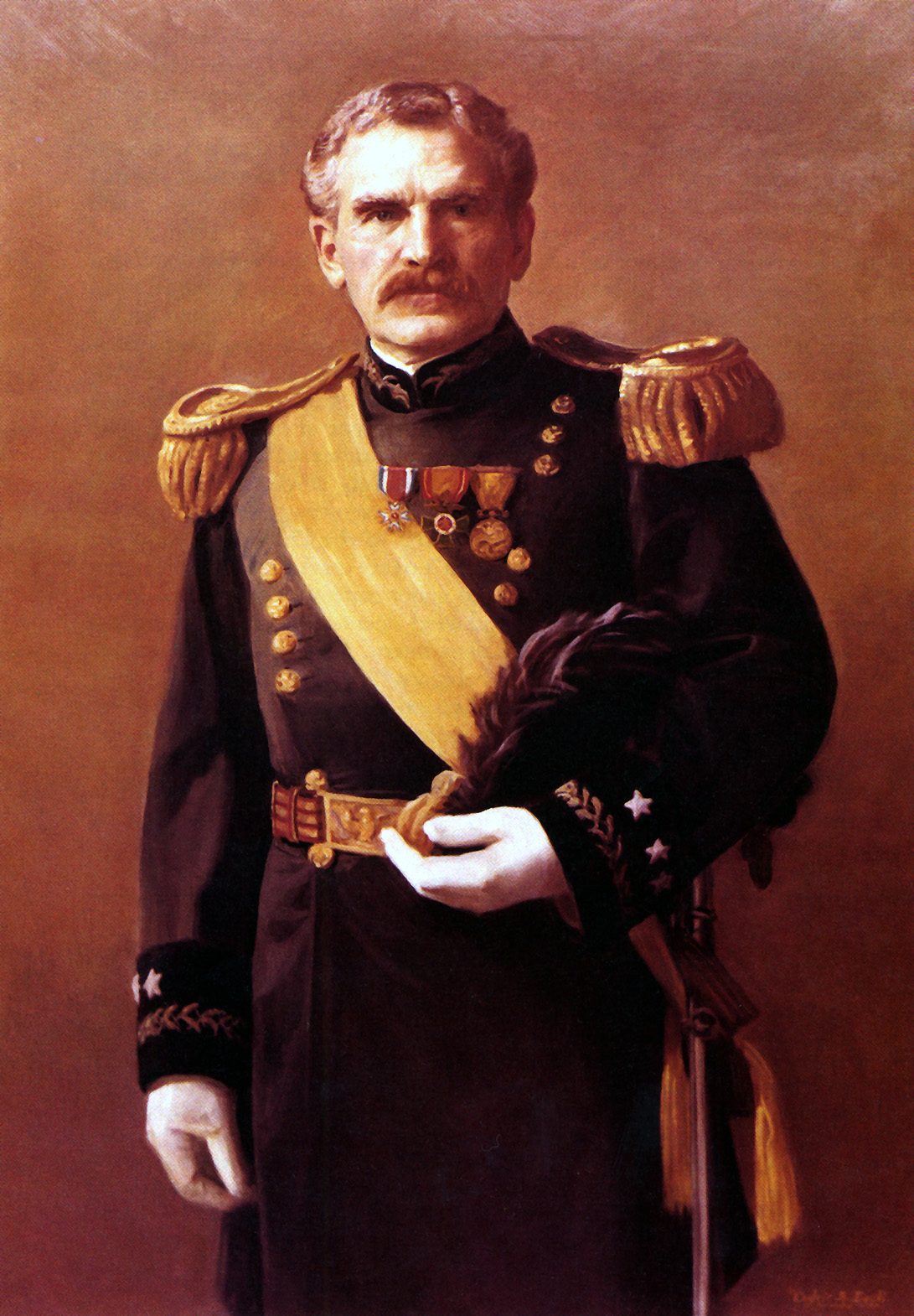
Lieutenant General Adna Chaffee, Chief of Staff of the Army 1904-1906 depicted wearing the buff sash of a general officer

At the time of the American Civil War (1861–65), generals of the regular US Army wore silk sashes in buff. Union Officers were authorized silk sashes in crimson (medical officers: emerald) while red woollen sashes were entitled to senior non-commissioned officers (Army Regulations of 1861). In the Confederate Army, sashes were worn by all sergeant ranks and officers. Sergeants wore red woollen sashes. Concerning Confederate commissioned officers, the colour indicated the corps or status of the wearer. For example: yellow for cavalry, burgundy for infantry, black for chaplains, green or blue for medics, and grey or cream for general officers.

=== Myanmar ===
Since 1948, Burmese presidents have worn the traditional Burmese sash worn by ancient Burmese kings, which resembles a Western-style sash, at state ceremonies. What makes Myanmar sash different from Western countries is that the sash is made of gold, and is called the golden sash.

=== Japan ===
Japanese officers continued the practice in full dress uniform until 1940.

== Presidential sash ==
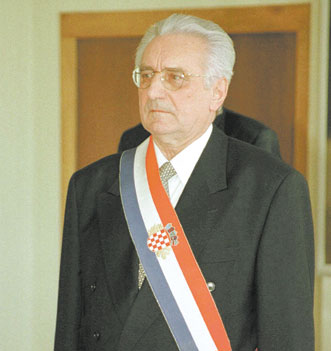
The presidential sash worn by Franjo Tuđman, President of Croatia between 1990 and 1999, has the red-white-blue colors of the Croatian flag, and an embroidery of the Croatian coat of arms - both archetypical features of the presidential sash

A presidential sash is a cloth sash worn by presidents of many nations in the world. Such sashes are worn by presidents in Africa, Asia, Europe and Latin America.

The sash is an important symbol of the continuity of the presidency and is only worn by the president. Its value as a symbol of the office of the head of state can be compared to that of a crown in monarchies. Presidents leaving office formally present the sash to their successor during the official inauguration ceremony.

Presidential sashes are usually very colorful, large, and designed to resemble the nation's flag, especially those of Latin American presidents. They are usually worn over the right shoulder to the left side of the hip. The national coat of arms is also traditionally placed on the sash. A national order's star or chain of office can also be worn.

== Modern civilian and cultural use ==
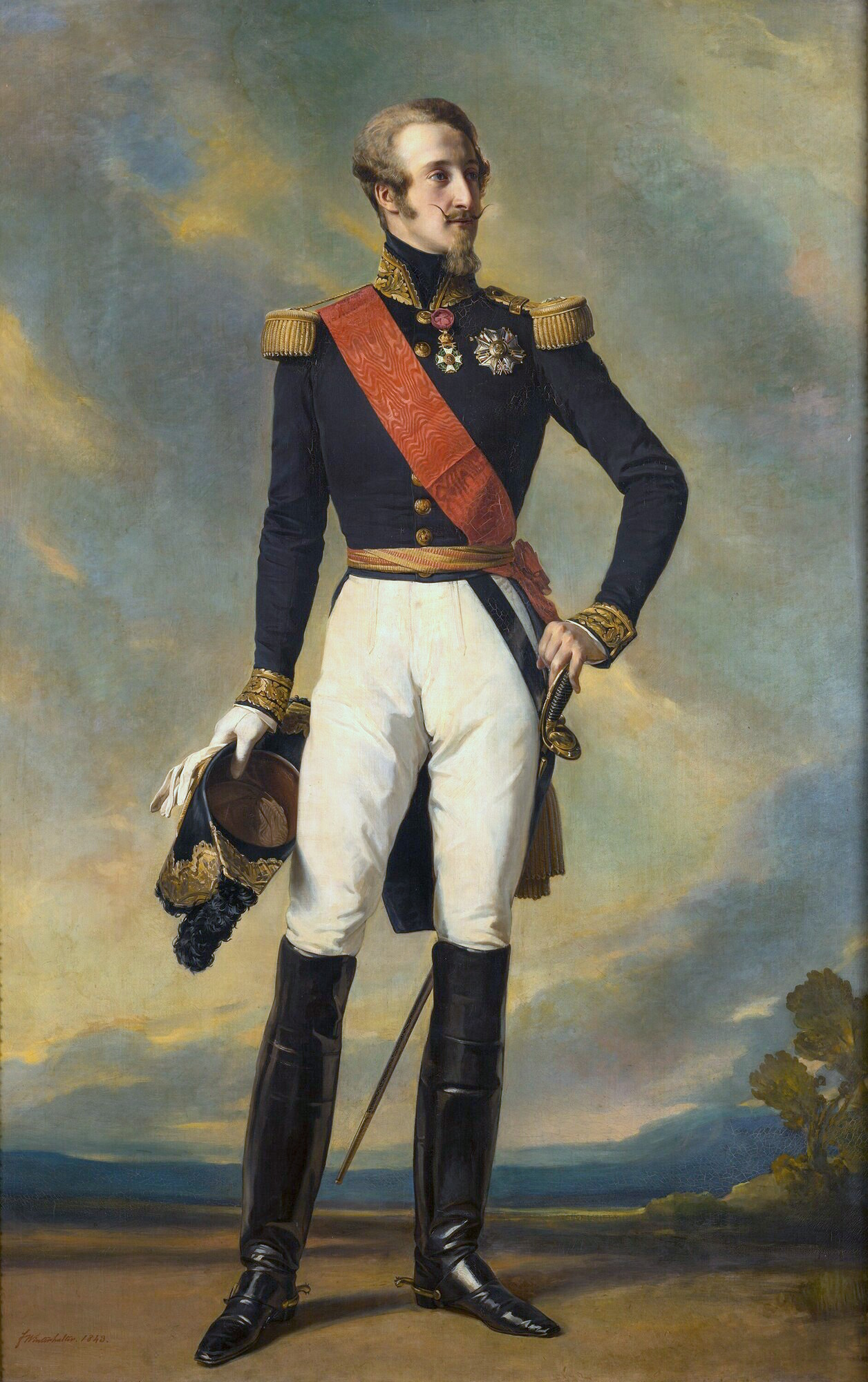
Prince Louis, Duke of Nemours, wearing the red sash of the Legion of Honour with his ceremonial military uniform, 1840s

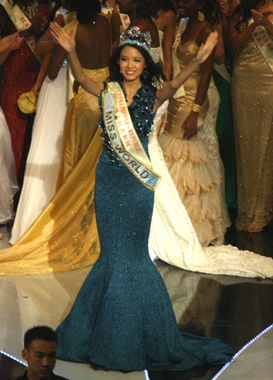
Beauty pageant winner wearing two sashes

With the genesis of complex systems of military and civilian awards during the 18th century in most European countries, sashes became a distinguishing part of honorific orders and are mostly worn along with decorations and medals. Today, various members of most European royal families wear sashes (also known as ribands) as part of their royal (and/or military) regalia on formal occasions. Some merit orders (such as the French Legion of Honour) also include sashes as part of the senior-most grades' insignia. Likewise, Italian military officers wear light blue sashes over the right shoulder on ceremonial occasions.

In Latin America and some countries of Africa, a special presidential sash indicates a president's authority. In France and Italy, sashes – featuring the national flag tricolours and worn on the right shoulder – are used by public authorities and local officials (such as legislators) during public ceremonial events.

In the United States, the sash has acquired a more ceremonial and less practical purpose. Sashes are used at higher education commencement ceremonies, by high school homecoming parade nominees, in beauty pageants, and by corporations to acknowledge high achievement.

In Canada, hand-woven sashes (known as ceintures fléchées or sometimes "L'Assomption sashes" after a Quebec town named L'Assomption in which they were mass-produced) were derived from Iroquois carrying belts sometime during the 18th century. As a powerful multi-use tool, this sash found use in the fur trade, which brought it into the North West using French voyageurs. During this period, the weave got tighter and size expanded, with some examples more than four metres in length. Coloured thread was widely used. The sash is a shared cultural emblem between French-Canadians and Métis peoples. Today, it is considered to be primarily a symbol of the 1837 Lower Canada Rebellion Patriotes and the Métis Nation. In modern times, Bonhomme Carnaval, the snowman mascot of the Quebec Winter Carnival, wears a ceinture fléchée as part of his attire in recognition of the province's heritage.

In the British Isles, especially Northern Ireland, the sash is a symbol of the Orange Order. Orange Order sashes were originally of the ceremonial shoulder-to-hip variety, as worn by the British military. Over the course of the 20th century, the sash was mostly replaced by V-shaped collarettes, which are still generally referred to as sashes. The item is celebrated in the song "The Sash my Father Wore".

Sashes are also worn by:

- Boy Scouts and Girl Guides, with badges sewn onto the sash to indicate Scouting achievements, red sashes are also worn by American Girl Scouts during flag ceremonies, with flag bearers wearing theirs over their shoulders and the remainder of the color guard wearing theirs around the waist
- Beauty pageant contestants, to display their region or title.

Sashes are part of the diplomatic uniform of many countries.

Many modern schools of Chinese martial arts use sashes of various colors to denote rank, as a reflection of the Japanese ranking system using belts. The Japanese equivalent of a sash, obi, serves to hold a kimono or yukata together.

== Honorific orders ==
Sashes are indicative of holding the class of Grand Cross or Grand Cordon in a chivalric order or an order of merit. The sash is usually worn from the right shoulder to the left hip. A few orders do the contrary, according to their traditional statute.

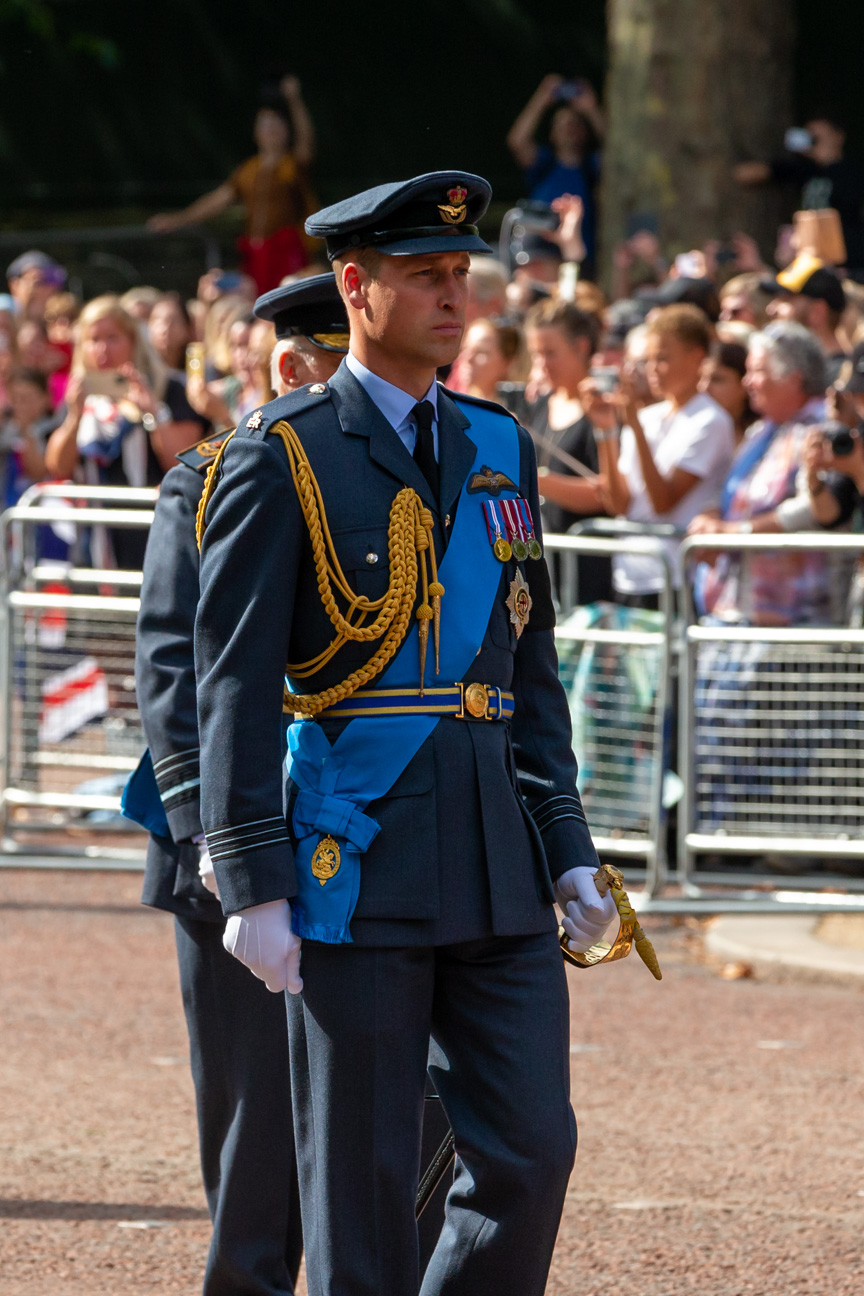
William, Prince of Wales, wearing Garter Riband and Star in 2022

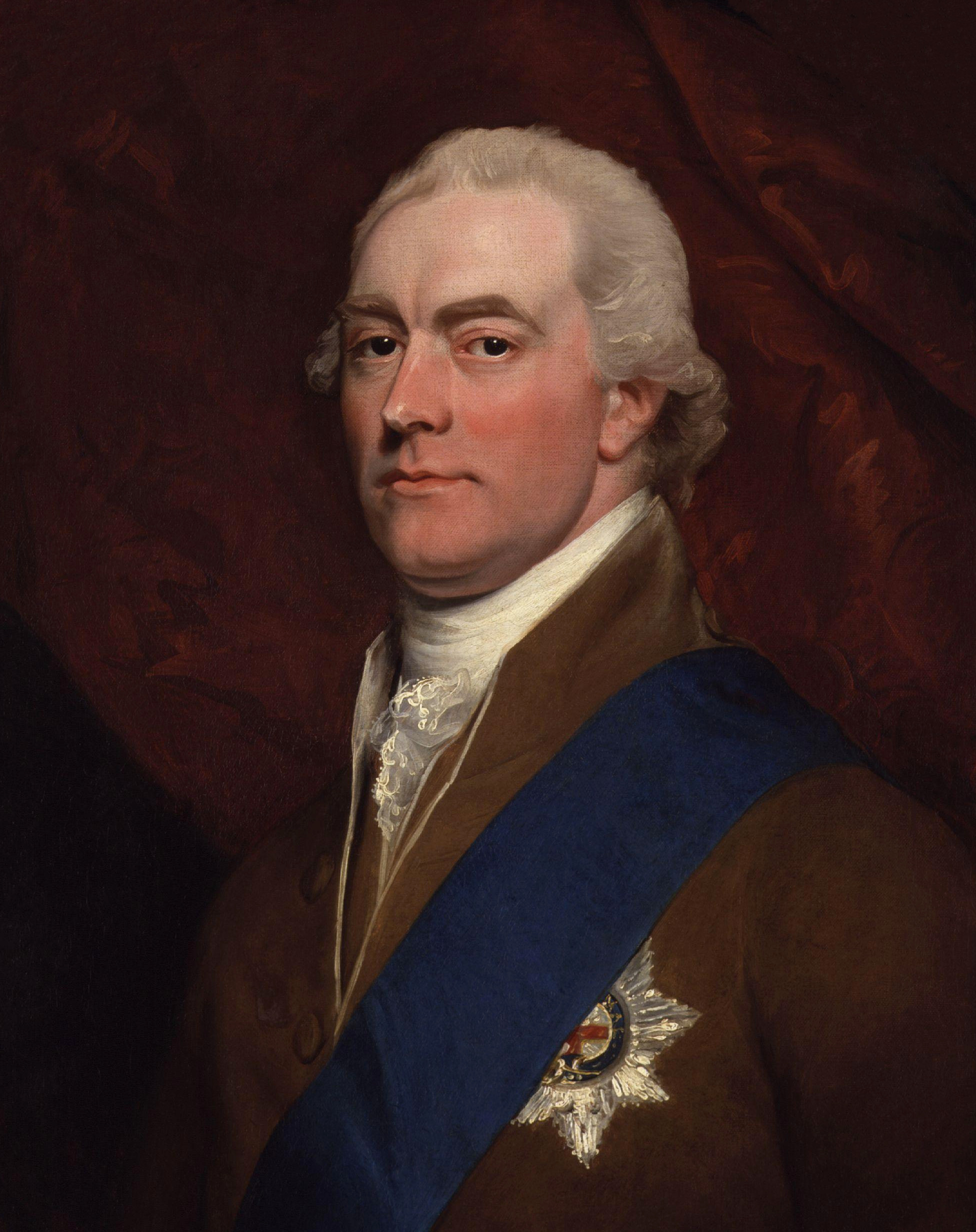
Knight of the Garter in c. 1800 with Garter sash

=== Orders with the sash worn on the left shoulder ===
Europe:

- Denmark: Order of the Elephant
- Iceland: Order of the Falcon
- Kingdom of Serbia: Order of the White Eagle
- United Kingdom: Order of the Garter
- United Kingdom (Scotland): Order of the Thistle

Asia:

- Myanmar: Order of Truth
- South Korea: Grand Order of Mugunghwa
- Thailand: Order of the Royal House of Chakri
- Thailand: Order of Chula Chom Klao
- Thailand: Knight Grand Cordon (Special Class) on left shoulder but Knight Grand Cross (First Class): right shoulder, for:
  - Order of the White Elephant
  - Order of the Crown of Thailand

Sultanate of Brunei
Decorations	Post-nominal	Grade	Ribbon	Sources
The Royal Family Order of the Crown of Brunei; Darjah Kerabat Mahkota Brunei	DKMB	Recipient		
The Most Esteemed Family Order of Laila Utama; Darjah Kerabat Laila Utama Yang Amat Dihormati	DK I	Recipient		
The Most Esteemed Family Order of Seri Utama; Darjah Kerabat Seri Utama Yang Amat Dihormati	DK II	Recipient		
The Most Eminent Order of Islam Brunei; Darjah Seri Ugama Islam Negara Brunei Yang Amat Bersinar	PSSUB	First Class		
The Most Illustrious Order of Paduka Laila Jasa Keberanian Gemilang; Darjah Paduka Laila Jasa Keberanian Gemilang Yang Amat Cemerlang	DPKG	First Class		
The Most Exalted Order of Paduka Keberanian Laila Terbilang; Darjah Paduka Keberanian Laila Terbilang Yang Amat Gemilang	DKLT	First Class		
The Most Gallant Order of Pahlawan Negara Brunei; Darjah Pahlawan Negara Brunei Yang Amat Perkasa	PSPNB	First Class		
The Most Blessed Order of Setia Negara Brunei; Darjah Setia Negara Brunei Yang Amat Bahagia	PSNB	First Class		
The Most Distinguished Order of Paduka Seri Laila Jasa; Darjah Paduka Seri Laila Jasa Yang Amat Berjasa	PSLJ	First Class		
The Most Honourable Order of Seri Paduka Mahkota Brunei; Darjah Seri Paduka Mahkota Brunei Yang Amat Mulia	SPMB	First Class		
The Most Faithful Order Order of Perwira Agong Negara Brunei; Darjah Perwira Agong Negara Brunei Yang Amat Setia	PANB	Recipient		
The Most Faithful Order Order of Perwira Agong Negara Brunei; Darjah Perwira Agong Negara Brunei Yang Amat Setia	PaNB	Recipient		
Federation of Malaysia
Decorations	Post-nominal	Grade	Ribbon	Sources
The Most Exalted and Most Illustrious Royal Family Order of Malaysia; Darjah Kerabat Diraja Malaysia	DKM	Recipient		
The Most Exalted Order of the Crown of the Realm; Darjah Utama Seri Mahkota Negara	DMN	Recipient		
Sultanate of Kedah
The Most Illustrious Royal Family Order of Kedah; Darjah Kerabat Yang Amat Mulia Kedah	DK	Member		
Sultanate of Kelantan
The Most Esteemed Royal Family Order of Kelantan (Al-Yunusi Star); Darjah Kerabat Yang Amat di-Hormati (Bintang al-Yunusi)	DK	Recipient		
Sultanate of Negeri Sembilan
The Most Illustrious Royal Family Order of Negeri Sembilan; Darjah Kerabat Negeri Sembilan Yang Amat di-Mulia	DKNS	Member		
The Order of Negeri Sembilan - Darjah Negeri Sembilan
Darjah Tertinggi Negeri Sembilan	DTNS	Paramount		
Darjah Mulia Negeri Sembilan	DMNS	Illustrious		
Sultanate of Pahang
The Most Illustrious Royal Family Order of Pahang; Darjah Kerabat Yang Maha Mulia Utama Kerabat di-Raja Pahang	DKP	Member (Ahli)		
The Most Esteemed Family Order of the Crown of Indra of Pahang; Darjah Kerabat Sri Indra Mahkota Pahang Yang Amat di-Hormati	DK I	Member 1st class		
Sultanate of Perak
The Most Esteemed Royal Family Order of Perak; Darjah Kerabat di-Raja Yang Amat di-Hormati	DK	Member (Ahli)	(before 2001) (after 2001)	
The Most Esteemed Perak Family Order of Sultan Azlan Shah; Darjah Kerabat Sultan Azlan Shah Perak Yang Amat di-Hormati	DKSA	Superior class		
The Most Esteemed Azlanii Royal Family Order; Darjah Yang Teramat Mulia Darjah Kerabat Azlanii	DKA I	Member First Class		
Sultanate of Perlis
The Most Esteemed Royal Family Order of Perlis; Darjah Kerabat di-Raja Perlis Yang Amat Amat di-Hormati	DKP	Recipient		
The M. Est. Perlis Family Order of the Gallant Prince Syed Putra Jamalullail; Darjah Kerabat Perlis Baginda Tuanku Syed Putra Jamalullail Yang Amat Amat di-Hormati	DK	Recipient		
Sultanate of Selangor
The Most Esteemed Royal Family Order of Selangor - Darjah Kerabat Selangor Yang Amat di-Hormati
Darjah Kerabat Selangor Pertama	DK I	First Class		
Darjah Kerabat Selangor Kedua	DK II	Second Class		
Sultanate of Terengganu
The Most Exalted Supreme Royal Family Order of Terengganu (10/03/1981); Darjah Utama Kerabat di-Raja Terengganu Yang Amat di-Hormati	DKT	Member (Ahli)		
The Most Distinguished Family Order of Terengganu (19/06/1962); Darjah Kebesaran Kerabat Terengganu Yang Amat Mulia	DK I	Member 1st class Ahli Yang Pertama		

=== Classified examples of current orders' sashes ===
Colours classified in the order of the rainbow :	White	Red	Orange	Yellow	Green	Blue	Indigo	Violet	Black

WHITE
( (Denmark) ) Order of the Dannebrog	( (Monaco) ) Order of Grimaldi	( (Lithuania) ) Order of Vytautas the Great	/ ( (Spain) ) Order of Isabella the Catholic	( (Portugal) ) Order of Liberty
RED
( (Portugal) ) Order of Christ	( (France) ) Order of the Legion of Honour	Order of the Lion of Finland	Order of Merit of the Grand Duchy of Luxembourg	Decoration of Honour for Services to the Republic of Austria
( (Monaco) ) Order of Saint-Charles	( (Argentina) ) Order of May	( (Czech Republic) ) Order of the White Lion	Order of the Crown of Tonga	( (Norway) ) Order of St. Olav
( (Eswatini) ) Royal Order of King Sobhuza II	( (Eswatini) ) Military Order of Swaziland	Royal Order of Cambodia	( (Hungary) ) Hungarian Order of Saint Stephen	Order of Oman
Order of the Star of Italy	( (Oman) ) Order of Al Said	Order of Merit of the Federal Republic of Germany	/ ( (Papua New Guinea) ) Order of Logohu	( (Thailand) ) Order of the White Elephant
( (Oman) ) Grand Order of Honour	( (Philippines) ) Order of the Golden Heart	( (Kenya) ) Order of the Burning Spear	( (Japan) ) Order of the Chrysanthemum	/ Order of Merit of the Principality of Liechtenstein
Order of the Star of Romania	( (Holy See) ) Order of Saint Gregory the Great	( (Taiwan) ) Order of Brilliant Jade	( (South Korea) ) Grand Order of Mugunghwa	( (Latvia) ) Order of Viesturs
( (Lithuania) ) Order of the Cross of Vytis	/ ( (United Kingdom) ) Order of the British Empire			
OTHER SHADES OF RED : CRIMSON / PINK
( (United Kingdom) ) Order of the Bath	( (Belgium) ) Order of the Crown	( (Estonia) ) Order of the White Star	( (Kingdom of Italy) ) Supreme Order of the Most Holy Annunciation	( (Thailand) ) Order of Chula Chom Klao
( (Portugal) ) Military Order of Saint James of the Sword
ORANGE
( (Tonga) ) Order of the Phoenix	( (Netherlands) ) Order of the House of Orange	( (Netherlands) ) Order for Loyalty and Merit	( (Bhutan) ) Order of the Dragon King	( (Bhutan) ) National Order of Merit
( (Japan) ) Order of the Precious Crown	( (Lithuania) ) Order of the Lithuanian Grand Duke Gediminas	( (Netherlands) ) Order of Orange-Nassau	( (Netherlands) ) Order of the Crown	( (Greece) ) Order of the Phoenix
YELLOW / GOLD / YELLOW-ORANGE
( (Mexico) ) Order of the Aztec Eagle	( (Thailand) ) Order of the Royal House of Chakri	( (Eswatini) ) Royal Order of the Great She-Elephant	( (Bhutan) ) Medal of Victory of the Thunder Dragon	( (Cambodia) ) Order of Moniseraphon
Royal Household Order of Tonga	( (Thailand) ) Order of the Rajamitrabhorn	National Order of Mali	( (Cameroon) ) Order of Merit	( (Eswatini) ) Royal Household Order of Swaziland
( (Luxembourg) - (Netherlands) ) Order of the Gold Lion of the House of Nassau	( (Greece) ) Order of Beneficence	( (Kenya) ) Order of the Golden Heart	( (Portugal) ) Order of Public Instruction	( (Sweden) ) Order of the Sword
GREEN
( (United Kingdom) ) Order of the Thistle	( (Portugal) ) Order of Aviz	( (Bolivia) ) Order of the Condor of the Andes	( (Italy) ) Order of Saints Maurice and Lazarus	( (Senegal) ) Order of the Lion
( (Monaco) ) Order of the Crown	( (Italy) ) Order of Merit of the Italian Republic	( (Oman) ) Grand Order of the Renaissance	Order of Merit of the Republic of Hungary	( (Thailand) ) Order of the Direkgunabhorn
Order of the Star of Jordan	Nishan-e-Pakistan	( (Sweden) ) Order of Vasa		
BLUE
( (Norway) ) Royal Norwegian Order of Merit	Order of the White Rose of Finland	( (Estonia) ) Order of the Cross of Terra Mariana	( (Portugal) ) Order of the Tower and Sword	Order of Merit of the Republic of Poland
( (France) ) Ordre national du Mérite	Order of the Merit of Chile	( (United Kingdom) ) Order of the Garter	( (Kingdom of France) ) Order of the Holy Spirit	( (Poland) ) Order of the White Eagle
( (Andorra) ) Order of Charlemagne	( (Sweden) ) Royal Order of the Seraphim	( (Tonga) ) Order of Queen Salote Tupou III	( (Denmark) ) Order of the Elephant	( (Brazil) ) Order of the Southern Cross
( (Lesotho) ) Most Dignified Order of Moshoeshoe	( (Brazil) ) Order of Rio Branco	( (Greece) ) Order of the Redeemer	( (Argentina) ) Order of the Liberator General San Martín	/ ( (Spain) ) Order of Civil Merit
/ ( (Spain) ) Order of Charles III	( (Romania) ) Order of Faithful Service	( (Iceland) ) Order of the Falcon	/ ( (United Kingdom) ) Royal Victorian Order	/ Order of the Crown of Thailand
/ ( (Malaysia) ) Order of the Defender of the Realm	/ Order of Loyalty to the Crown of Malaysia	( (United Kingdom) ) Order of St Michael and St George	( (Slovakia) ) Order of the White Double Cross	( (Holy See) ) Order of Pius IX
( (Luxembourg) ) Order of Adolphe of Nassau	( (Greece) ) Order of Honour	Order of the Netherlands Lion	( (Latvia) ) Order of the Three Stars	( (Ukraine) ) Order of Prince Yaroslav the Wise
( (Belgium) ) Order of Leopold II	( (Egypt) ) Order of the Nile	( (United States) ) Presidential Medal of Freedom W/ Distinction	Order of Makarios III	
VIOLET - PURPLE
( (Portugal) ) Order of Saint James of the Sword	( (Belgium) ) Order of Leopold	( (Peru) ) Order of the Sun	( (Jordan) ) Order of al-Hussein bin Ali	( (Jordan) ) Order of Independence
( (Panama) ) Order of Vasco Núñez de Balboa	( (Singapore) ) Distinguished Service Order (Military)			
BLACK
( (Holy See) ) Order of the Holy Sepulchre	Sovereign Military Order of Malta	( (Thailand) ) Order of Rama	( (Portugal) ) Order of Merit	( (Holy See) ) Order of Saint Sylvester
( (Sweden) ) Order of the Polar Star
TRICOLOR / MORE COMPLEX
( (Papua New Guinea) ) Order of the Star of Melanesia	( (Portugal) ) Sash of the Three Orders	( (Portugal) ) Order of Prince Henry	Star of the Solomon Islands	( (Gabon) ) National Order of Merit
Royal Order of Bhutan	( (Jordan) ) Supreme Order of the Renaissance	( (Croatia) ) Grand Order of King Tomislav	( (Croatia) ) Grand Order of Queen Jelena	( (Ukraine) ) Order of Liberty
Most Courteous Order of Lesotho

== See also ==
- West Point Cadets' Sword
- Order (honour)
- Phaleristics
- Religious sash
- Livery collar
- O'Higgins Pioche

== Bibliography ==
- Craig, John (1849), A new universal etymological technological, and pronouncing dictionary of the English language, p. 620
- Metcalf, Allan A. (1999), The World in So Many Words, Houghton Mifflin, ISBN 0-395-95920-9
