= Claudio Vicuña =

President-elect of Chile (1891)

His Excellency Claudio Vicuña Guerrero
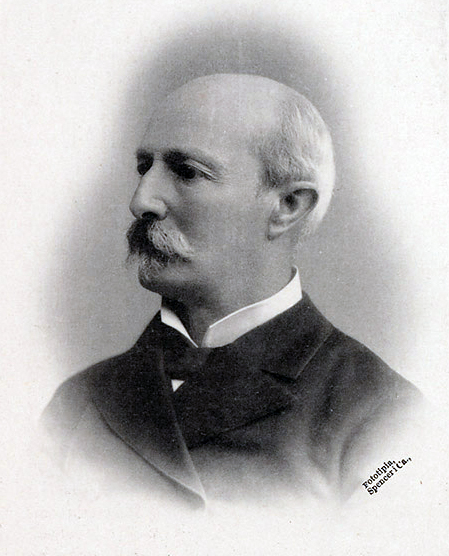
- Official portrait as presidential candidate, 1891

President-elect of Chile
- Election; 25 July 1891
- Preceded by: José Manuel Balmaceda (1886)
- Succeeded by: Jorge Montt (Oct. 1891)
Executive offices
Minister of the Interior
In office 15 October 1890 – 7 January 1891
President	José Manuel Balmaceda
Preceded by	Belisario Prats Pérez
Succeeded by	Domingo Godoy Cruz
In office 23 February 1891 – 12 March 1891
President	José Manuel Balmaceda
Preceded by	Domingo Godoy Cruz
Succeeded by	Manuel José Yrarrázaval Larraín
Legislative offices
Member of the Senate
In office 4 June 1879 – 4 June 1885
Constituency	Santiago
In office 4 June 1888 – c. 1890-1891
Constituency	Santiago
In office 4 June 1900 – 4 June 1906
Constituency	Coquimbo
Member of the Chamber of Deputies
In office 4 June 1876 – 4 June 1889
Constituency	Santiago

Personal details
- Born: 31 December 1833 Santiago, Santiago province, Chile
- Died: 28 February 1907 (aged 73) Santiago, Santiago province, Chile
- Party: See list: Liberal Party (until 1891); Liberal Democratic Party (1895-1907)
- Spouse: Lucía Subercaseaux Vicuña ()
- Children: 12

Claudio Vicuña Guerrero (Santiago, December 31, 1833 - Santiago, February 28, 1907) was a politician and diplomat from Chile, who served as Minister of the Interior between 1890 and 1891 during the government of José Manuel Balmaceda, in the midst of the outbreak of the Chilean Civil War of 1891. He was elected President of the Republic of Chile in the July 1891 election, although he was unable to take office due to the opposition's victory over Balmaceda in the civil war.

== Biography ==
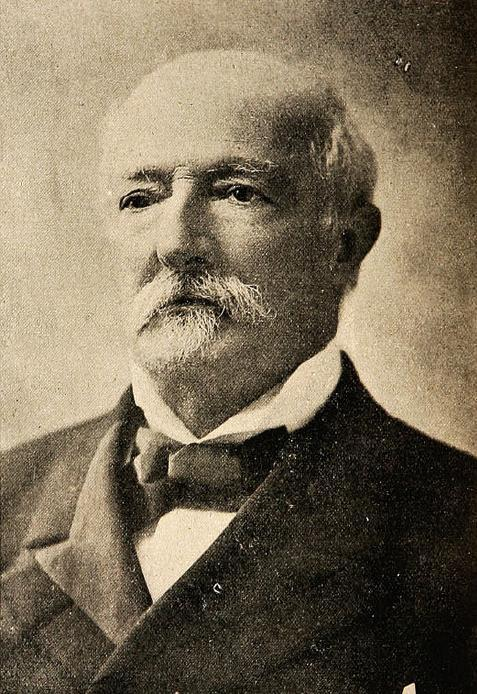
Photograph of Claudio Vicuña around 1907.

He was the son of Ignacio Vicuña Aguirre, who served as a deputy for Quillota between 1840 and 1843, and Carmen Guerrero Varas. He had seven siblings, among whom Ricardo Vicuña Guerrero stood out, serving as a deputy (1873–1876) and senator of the Constituent Congress of 1891. Despite coming from an aristocratic family, he was orphaned at an early age. He studied at the Instituto Nacional and later engaged in agriculture, where he amassed great wealth.

He was married to Lucía Subercaseaux Vicuña, with whom he had seven children. Among his children, politicians Augusto and Claudio Vicuña Subercaseaux stood out.

In the political sphere, he was a member of the Liberal Party and the Liberal Democratic Party. He was elected deputy for the province of Santiago for the 1876–1879 term. In 1879 he became a senator of the Republic for the same province, a position he held for two terms: 1879-1885 and 1888–1894.

After the outbreak of the Chilean Civil War of 1891, he remained loyal to the government of José Manuel Balmaceda, assuming the position of Minister of the Interior between October 15, 1890, and January 7, 1891. In this role, he was one of the conveners of the Constituent Congress established by Balmaceda to replace the suspended National Congress. He resumed the position of Minister of the Interior between February 23 and March 12, 1891. That same year, he also served as the intendant of Valparaíso. In the midst of the civil war, Vicuña was nominated as the Liberal Party's presidential candidate at its convention on March 8, 1891. Indirect presidential elections took place on 25 July 1891, with Vicuña elected president.

The definitive defeat of the Balmacedists after the Battle of Placilla left Vicuña's victory null and void. The military junta established its president, Captain Jorge Montt, as the sole candidate for the October 1891 elections.

The opposition's victory led Vicuña to seek diplomatic asylum, as he was considered a key member of the "Balmacedist dictatorship." Following his exile, he returned to Chile and continued his political career, participating in the reconstruction of the Balmacedist movement through the Liberal Democratic Party. He remained an influential figure in Chilean politics, advocating for the reintegration of Balmacedist supporters into the national political landscape.

Vicuña died in Santiago on 28 February 1907, leaving behind a significant legacy as one of the key figures of the Balmacedist movement and Chilean liberalism at the turn of the 20th century.
