= 1891 Chilean presidential election =

The 1891 Chilean presidential election may refer to:

- July 1891 Chilean presidential election
- October 1891 Chilean presidential election
