= Order of the Renaissance =

Order of the Renaissance may refer to:

- Order of the Renaissance (Bahrain), awarded by the Kingdom of Bahrain
- Order of the Renaissance (Oman), awarded by the Sultanate of Oman
- Supreme Order of the Renaissance, awarded by the Hashemite Kingdom of Jordan
