= Order of Honour (Oman) =

Omani order

Order of Honour وسام التكريم

Awarded by Sultan of Oman
- Type: State
- Established: 1990
- Country: Oman
- Royal house: Al Bu Sa'id
- Status: Currently constituted
- Founder: Sultan Qaboos bin Said
- Sovereign: Sultan Haitham bin Tariq

Precedence
- Next (higher): Order of Al Nu'man
- Next (lower): Order of Excellence
- Ribbon bar of the order

The Order of Honour (Arabic: وسام التكريم, romanized: Wisam al-Takrim) is an order of Oman.

== History ==
The order was established by Sultan Qaboos bin Said in 1990 to coincide with his 20th anniversary on the throne. It is awarded in a single class.

== Insignia ==
The insignia was made by Asprey and consists of a sash riband, badge, and star. The ribbon is dark red with a center green stripe and thin white stripes on either side. The badge is a six pointed star with inverted white points set with a pearl and between each one is a red enamel castellated point. The center features the national emblem of Oman on a green enamel background with a white border all set in yellow gold.

== Notable recipients ==
- Captain Saleh Al Jabri (2010)
- Gianfranco Corsi Zaffarel (2011)
- Placido Domingo Embil (2011)
- Abdul Latif Yousef Al Hamad (2022)
- Mark Evans (2023)
- Mikhail Piotrovsky (2023)
- Umberto Vanni (2024)
- Dr. Uğur Ünal (2025)
