= Order of Al Nu'man =

Order of Oman

Order of Al Nu'man وسام النعمان

Awarded by Sultan of Oman
- Type: State
- Established: 1982
- Country: Oman
- Royal house: Al Bu Sa'id
- Status: Currently constituted
- Founder: Sultan Qaboos bin Said
- Sovereign: Sultan Haitham bin Tariq
- Classes: Three

Precedence
- Next (higher): Order of Merit
- Next (lower): Order of Honour
- Ribbon bar of the order

The Order of Al Nu'man (Arabic: وسام النعمان, romanized: Wisam al-Naaman) is an order of Oman awarded to high ranking diplomats.

== History ==
The order was instituted in 1982 by Sultan Qaboos bin Said prior to his state visit to the United Kingdom. It is made up of three classes.

== Insignia ==
Crown of Oman

The insignia of the order consists of a riband, badge, star, and miniature. The ribbon is yellow with blue borders. The badge is a ten pointed star of alternating gold and silver with the crown of Oman at the center on a blue enamel background with a red border.

== Notable recipients ==
=== First class ===
- Ashok Kumar Attri (2007), former Indian ambassador to Oman
- Seiji Morimoto (2011), former Japanese ambassador to Oman
- Yu Fulong (2018), former Chinese ambassador to Oman
- Eid Mohammed al Thaqafi (2021), former Saudi ambassador to Oman
- Yousef Furtas (2022), former Honorary Consul General of Switzerland
- Tibor Szatmari (2022), former Hungarian ambassador to Oman
- Ali Najafi (2024), former Iranian ambassador to Oman
- Abdullah bin Saud Al Anazi (2023), former Saudi ambassador to Oman
- Amjad Jamil Al Quhaiwi (2025), former Jordanian ambassador to Oman
