= President of Chile =

Head of state and government

President of the Republic of Chile
- Presidente de la República de Chile
- Presidential standard

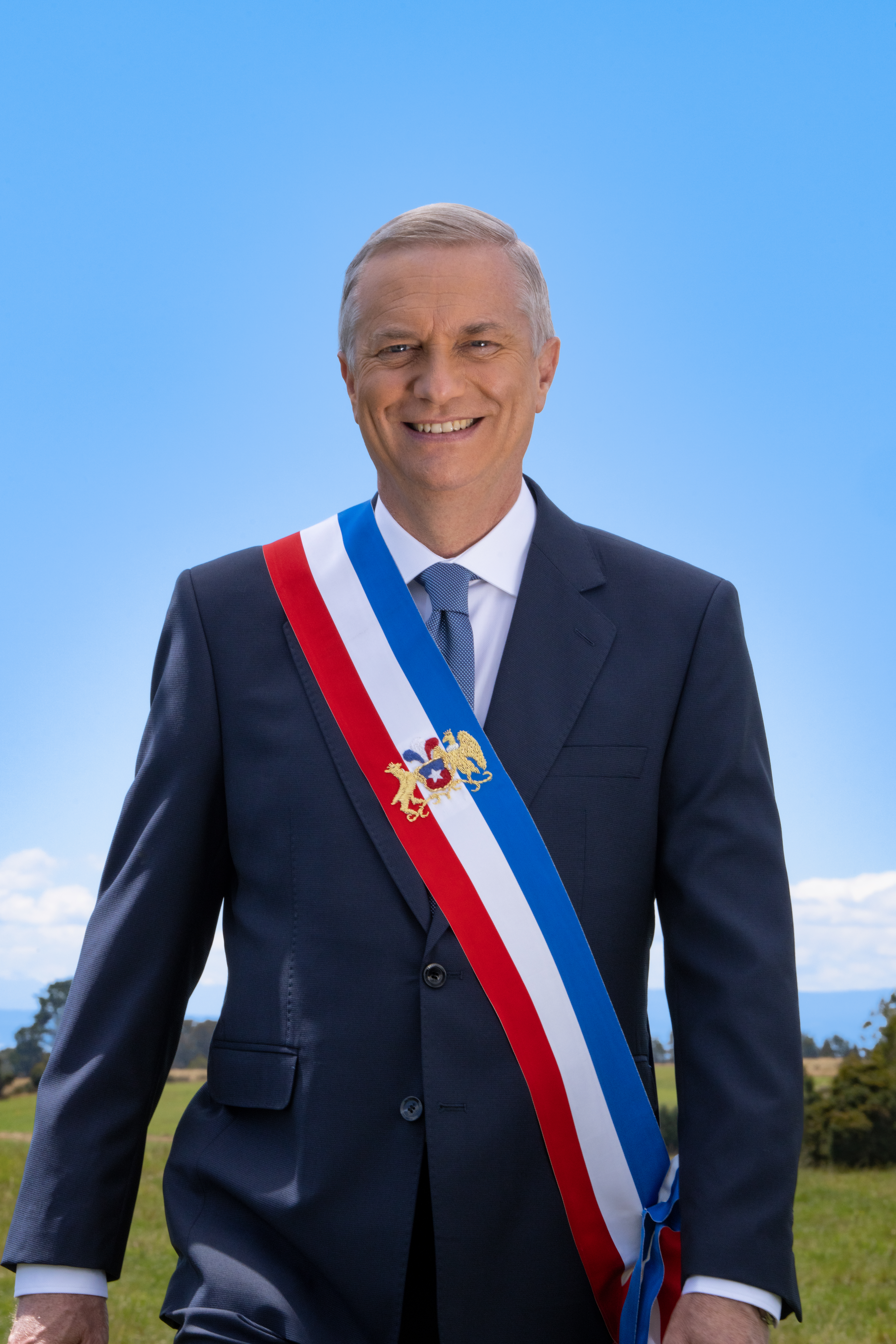
- Incumbent; José Antonio Kast since 11 March 2026
- Executive branch of the Government of Chile
- Style: Mr./Madam President (Señor/a Presidente/a) (informal); The Most Excellent (Excelentísimo/a Señor/a) (diplomatic); His/Her Excellency (Su Excelencia) (diplomatic)
- Type: Head of state Head of government
- Residence: Palace of Cerro Castillo
- Seat: La Moneda Palace
- Appointer: Popular vote
- Term length: Four years, renewable non-consecutively
- Constituting instrument: Constitution of Chile (1980)
- Inaugural holder: Manuel Blanco Encalada
- Formation: 9 June 1826 (200 years ago)
- Succession: Line of succession
- Deputy: Ministry of the Interior (as ex officio "Vice-President")
- Salary: 155,199,315 Chilean pesos/US$190,466 annually
- Website: www.gob.cl

The president of Chile (Spanish: Presidente de Chile), officially the president of the Republic of Chile (Spanish: Presidente de la República de Chile), is the head of state and head of government of the Republic of Chile. The president is responsible for both government administration and state administration. Although its role and significance have changed over time, and its position and relations with other actors in the national political organization have also evolved, it remains one of the most prominent political offices in the country. It is also considered one of the key institutions that form the "Historic Constitution of Chile", and is crucial to the country's political stability.

Under the current Constitution, adopted in 1980, the president serves a four-year term and is not eligible for immediate re-election. The shorter term (previously it was six years) allows for synchronized parliamentary and presidential elections. The president's official seat is the La Moneda Palace in the capital Santiago.

Michelle Bachelet was the first female president of Chile and served twice, from 2006 to 2010 and again from 2014 to 2018. José Antonio Kast is the current president, having won the 2025 Chilean general election and taken office on 11 March 2026.

== History ==
The origins of Chile as a nation can be traced to 1541, when it was separated from the existing Viceroyalty of Peru by King Charles I, creating the new Kingdom of Chile. The head of state continued to be the king, but he was represented locally by the Royal Governor.

== Features of the office ==
=== Requirements ===
The Constitution of 1980, with its 2005 amendment, outlines the qualifications for becoming president. To be eligible, the individual must be a natural-born Chilean citizen or born abroad to Chilean parents or grandparents. They must also be at least 35 years old and meet all the requirements for becoming a Senator.

In addition, the president must have the right to vote as a fully Chilean citizen, which includes being at least 18 years of age, not having been sentenced to a severe punishment, not having lost the right to vote due to insanity, not having been tried or condemned for a serious crime or terrorist conduct, nor condemned by the Constitutional Court under Article 8 of the Chilean Constitution.

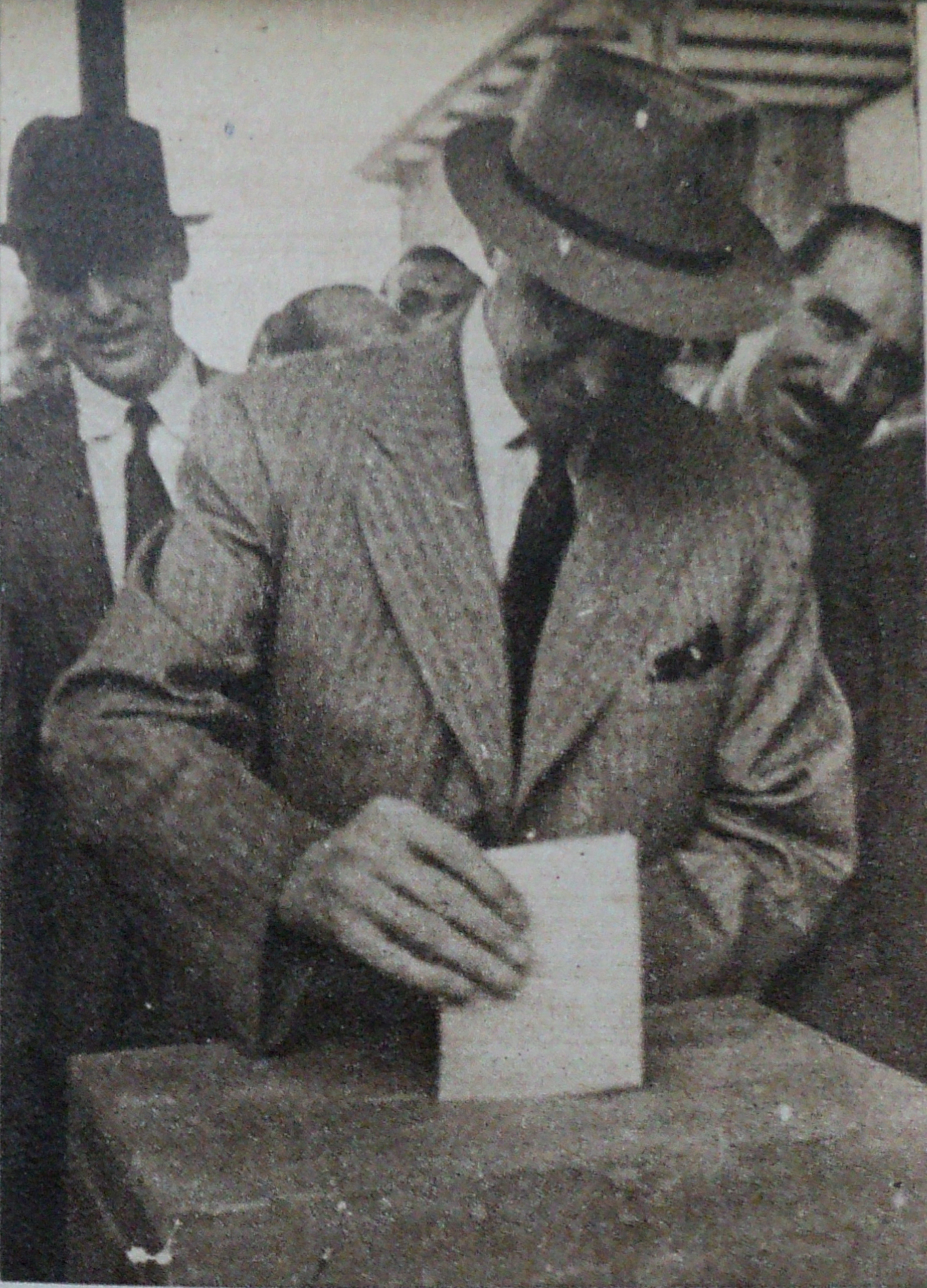
Juan Antonio Ríos voting in the 1942 election, where he was elected as President

=== Election ===
Article 26 detail the electoral requirements. The president shall be elected by direct ballot, with an absolute majority of the votes validly cast. A two-round system is used. In order to win the election in the first round, the winning candidate's party must receive more than 50 percent of the valid votes leaving out of the count blank and spoiled votes.

The election shall be held the third Sunday of November of the year immediately before the end of the administration of the president then holding office. Should there be more than two candidates in the presidential election, none of them obtaining more than half of the votes validly cast, a new election shall be held. The second election ("balloting"), in the manner determined by law, shall be held the fourth Sunday after the first election, limited to the two candidates with the highest relative majorities. Then, the candidate with the majority of valid votes in that round is elected president. Previously, under the 1925 constitution, the Congress of Chile elected the president in the run-off, including (notably) in the 1970 Chilean presidential election.

=== Term duration ===
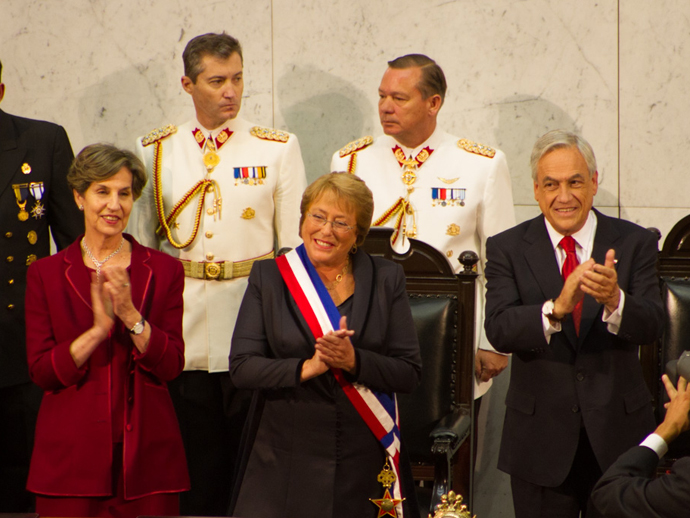
Both Michelle Bachelet (center) and Sebastián Piñera (right) were elected for two non-consecutive terms.

Under the 1828 constitution, the president served for four years, without the possibility of immediate reelection for one more term. In 1833, the presidential period was changed to five years, with a possibility of immediate reelection for one more term, limited to two consecutive terms. Then by a constitutional reform in 1878, possibility for reelection became disallowed. Under the 1925 constitution, the president served for a six-year term, without the possibility of immediate reelection. Non-consecutive election was possible, as seen with Jorge Alessandri (president 1958–1964) running a close second in the momentous election of 1970, although ultimately it did not occur.

In the original text of the 1980 constitution, the president served for an eight-year term without the possibility of immediate reelection. Some transitory disposals, fixed during the military dictatorship of the general Augusto Pinochet, allowed the exceptional possibility of his reelection in the 1988 plebiscite. Then, in the transition to democracy the 1989 referendum established a first transitional four-year presidential term (1990–1994), followed by common eight-year terms, without the possibility of immediate reelection. However, on 4 March 1994 (a week before Eduardo Frei Ruiz-Tagle took office), the presidential period was reduced to a six-year term, without an immediate reelection.

Under the 2005 constitutional reform, the president serves for four years without the possibility of immediate reelection for one more term. A former president may run for office once again after serving their initial term, but only in an election following their successor, as it is not allowed to run for consecutive terms. There is no limit to how many times a person can run for candidacy if they have not previously served as president.

The incumbent president, in accordance with the constitution, completes their corresponding term on 11 March of the immediate year after the election. The president-elect takes office the same day.

=== Succession ===
If the president is unable to perform his or her duties, the President's powers are usually temporarily transferred to the minister of the interior under the title of "Vice President". However, this is not a substantive position. Rather, the holder of the position fulfills the duties of the president only for as long as the president is incapacitated or a vacancy occurs. If the president and the minister of the interior are both temporarily unavailable, the next minister of the government, in the order of succession, becomes the vice president. The consent of the Senate is required for the vice president to exercise the duties of the president.

=== Line of succession ===
A partial constitutional amendment in 2011 established the order of presidential succession in the order of Minister of the Interior, Minister of Foreign Affairs, and Minister of National Defense.

Names of incumbents as of 2026:

President of the Republic: José Antonio Kast

1. Minister of the Interior and Public Security: Claudio Alvarado
2. Minister of Foreign Affairs: Francisco Pérez Mackenna
3. Minister of National Defense: Fernando Barros
4. Minister of Finance: Jorge Quiroz
5. Minister Secretary-General of the Presidency: José García Ruminot
6. Minister General Secretariat of Government: Mara Sedini
7. Minister of Economy: Daniel Mas
8. Minister of Social Development: María Jesús Wulf
9. Minister of Education: María Paz Arzola
10. Minister of Justice: Fernando Rabat
11. Minister of Labor and Social Provision: Tomás Rau
12. Minister of Housing & Urbanism: Iván Poduje

== Presidential symbols ==
=== Presidential sash ===
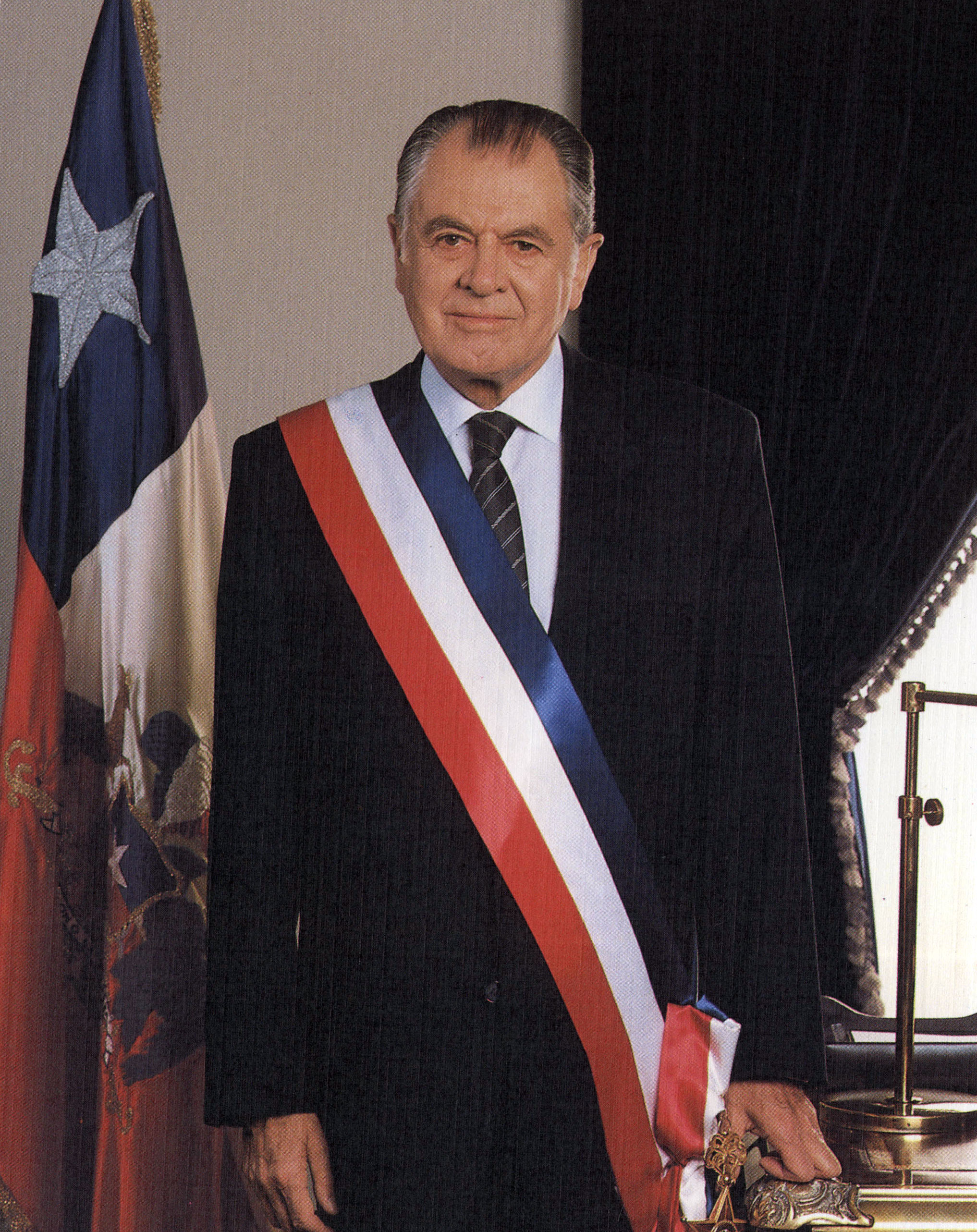
President Patricio Aylwin (in office 1990–1994) wearing the presidential sash in his official portrait

The presidential sash, used initially by Bernardo O'Higgins, became a symbol of the authority of the first president with the assumption of office by President José Joaquín Prieto in 1831. It is composed of three stripes with the colors of the Chilean flag, it is sewn by hand and measured approximately 75 cm (30 in) long and 13 cm (5.1 in) wide.

From the nineteenth century a single sash was maintained that was transferred from president to president until 1915, due to the height differences between the outgoing Ramón Barros Luco and the elected Juan Luis Sanfuentes, so a new sash had to be designed. Since that date, each president has had his or her own presidential sash, which is used only in official ceremonies.

=== O'Higgins Pioche ===
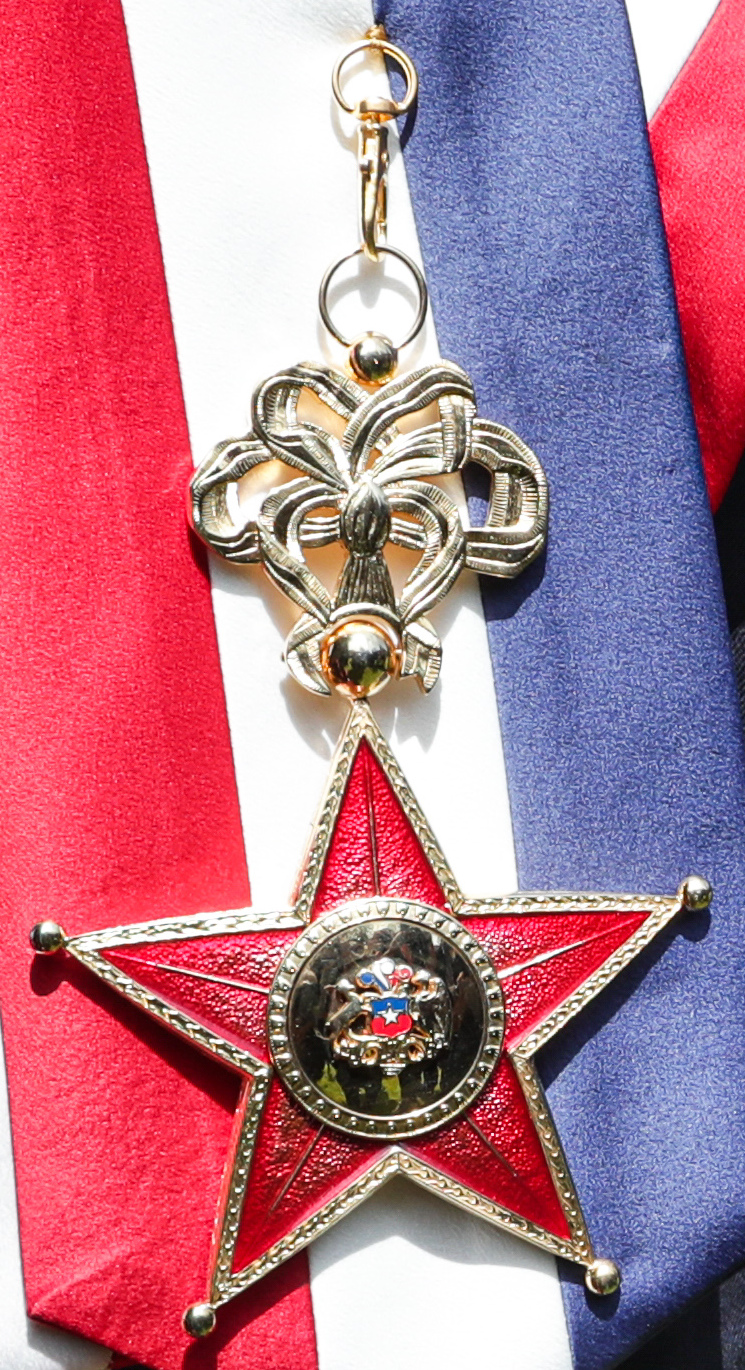
The O'Higgins Pioche

The O'Higgins Pioche, which is considered the symbol of presidential power and is placed at the lower end of the presidential sash, is a star of five ends of about 7 cm (2.8 in) in diameter, enameled in red. It dates back to the medals of the Legion of Merit and remained intact until the coup d'état of 1973, when it disappeared during the bombing of the La Moneda palace. During the military regime of Augusto Pinochet a replica of the pioche was created, based on photographs of the original. It is only used together with the presidential sash.

=== Ford Galaxie 500 ===
The president of Chile traditionally used an elegant horse drawn "Bandeja" Carriage imported from France by President José Manuel Balmaceda for ceremonial events until president Salvador Allende, not wanting to project the image of royalty that carriages now confer, used the black 1966 Ford Galaxie XL convertible acquired in 1968 for Queen Elizabeth II's visit to Chile as his official vehicle with a normally issued license plate (EL-2801).

Both the carriage and the Galaxie have since been maintained by the state and are now used only for official ceremonies, such as state visits and the national holidays on 21 May and 19 September, and presidential inaugurations which take place on 11 March every four years.

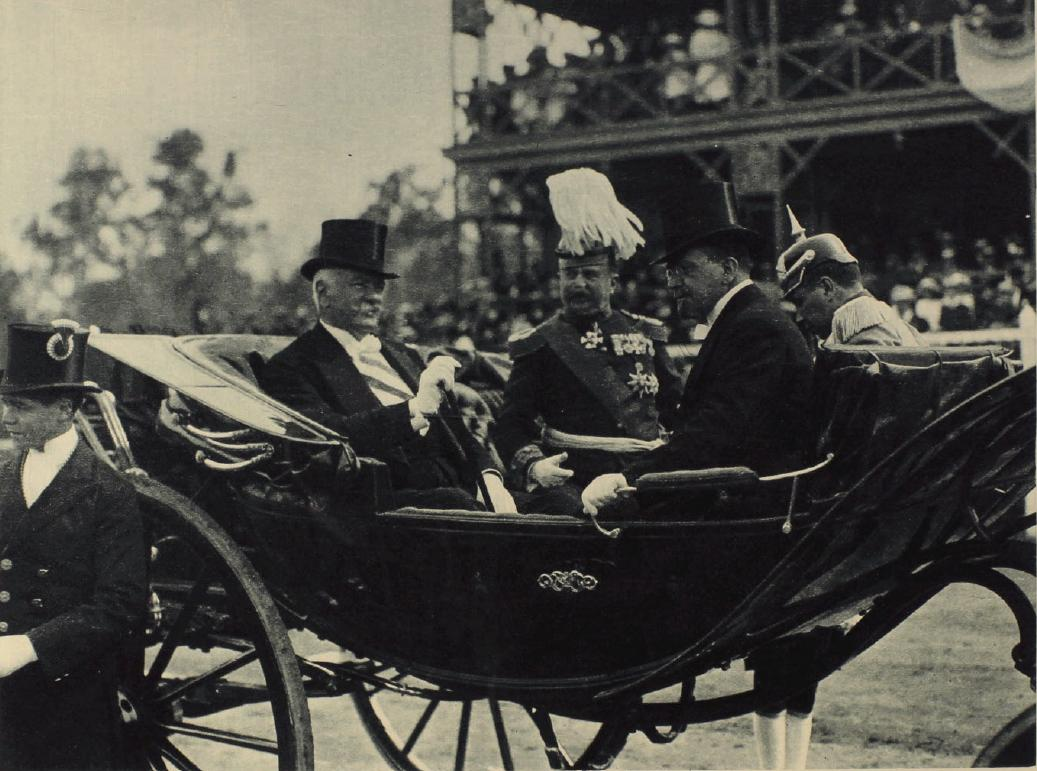
Juan Luis Sanfuentes arriving at the Dia de las Glorias del Ejercito in 1916

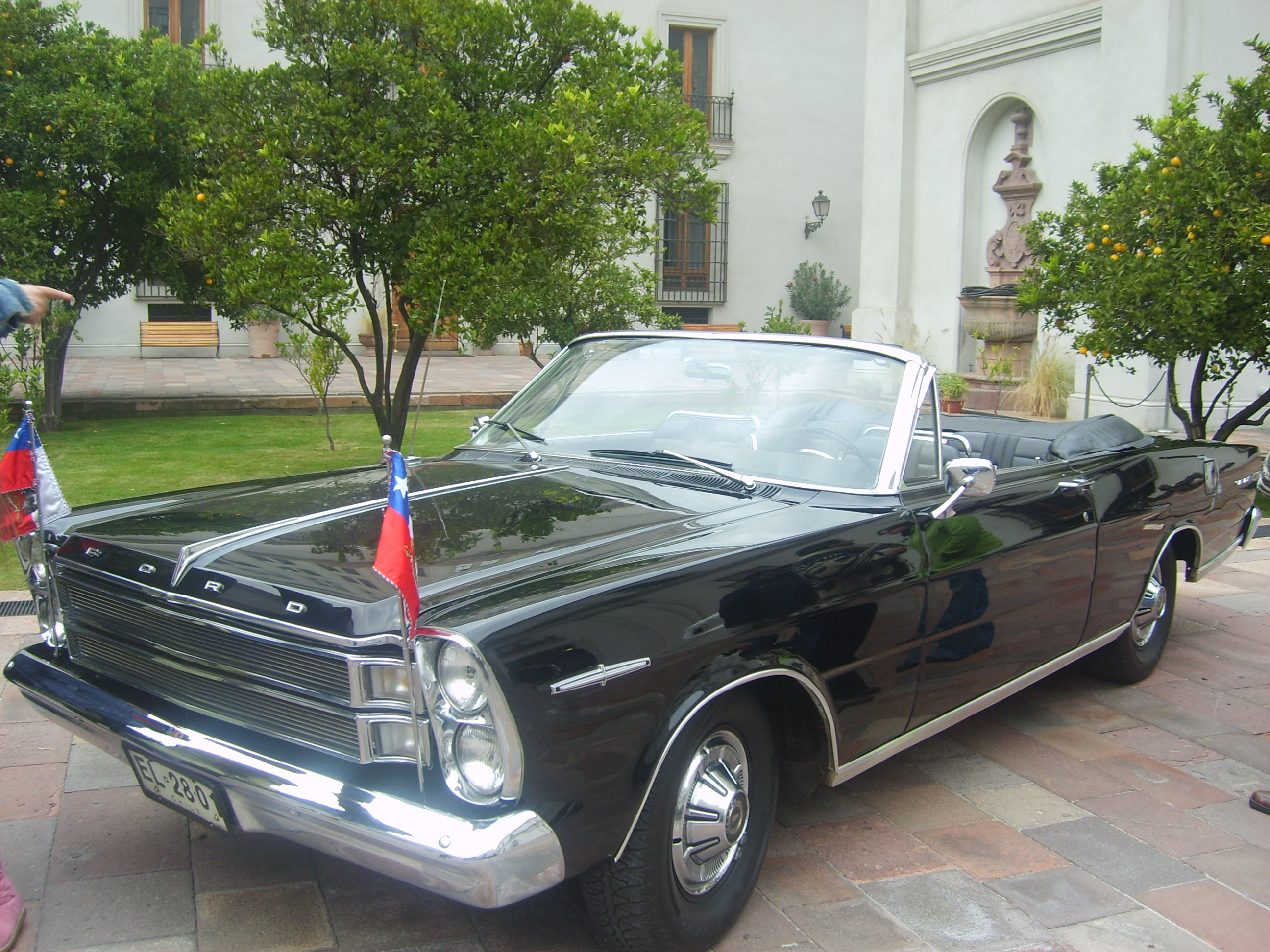
Ford Galaxie 500, the presidential car used in ceremonies

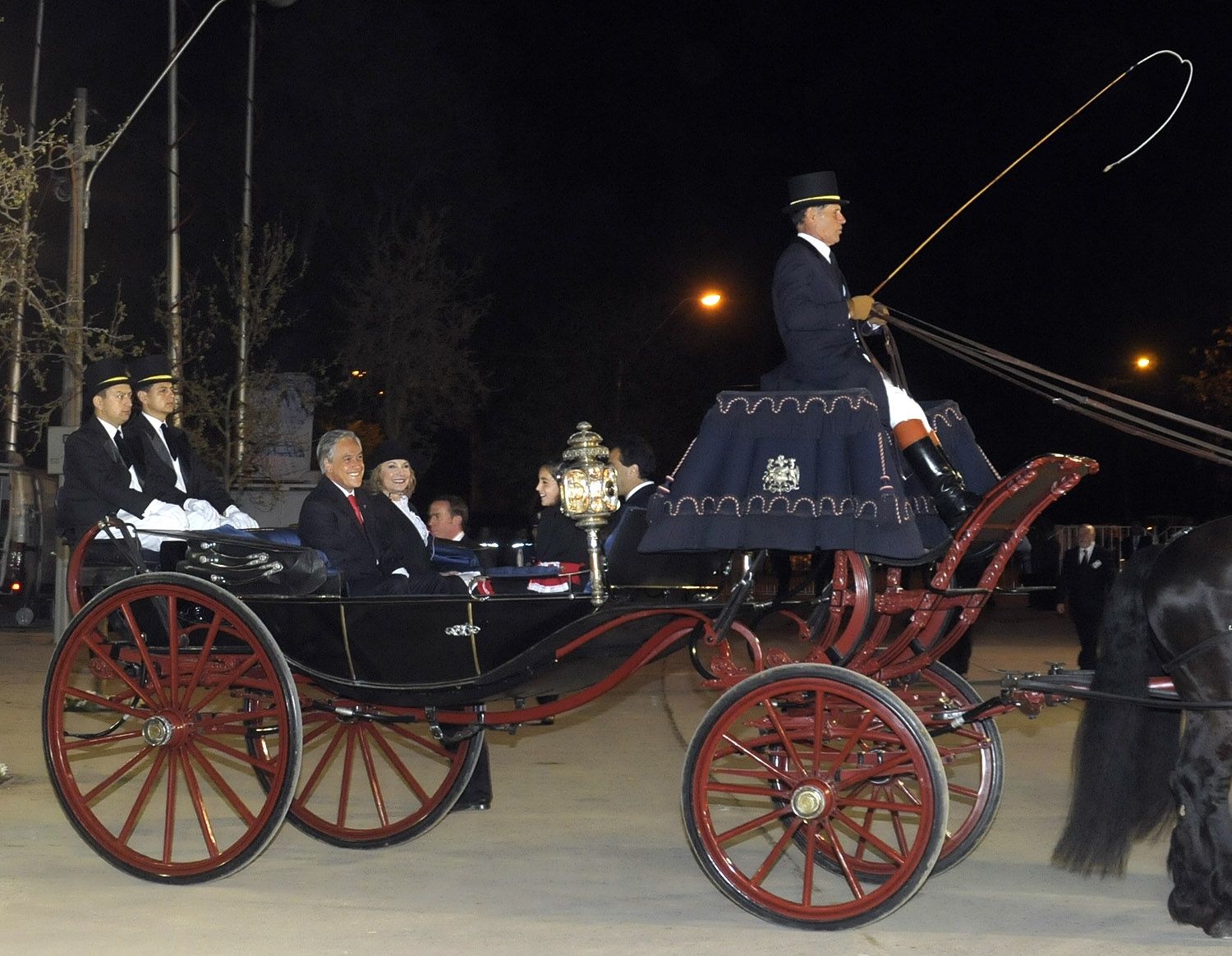
Sebastián Piñera in the Balmaceda carriage on Fiestas Patrias in 2010

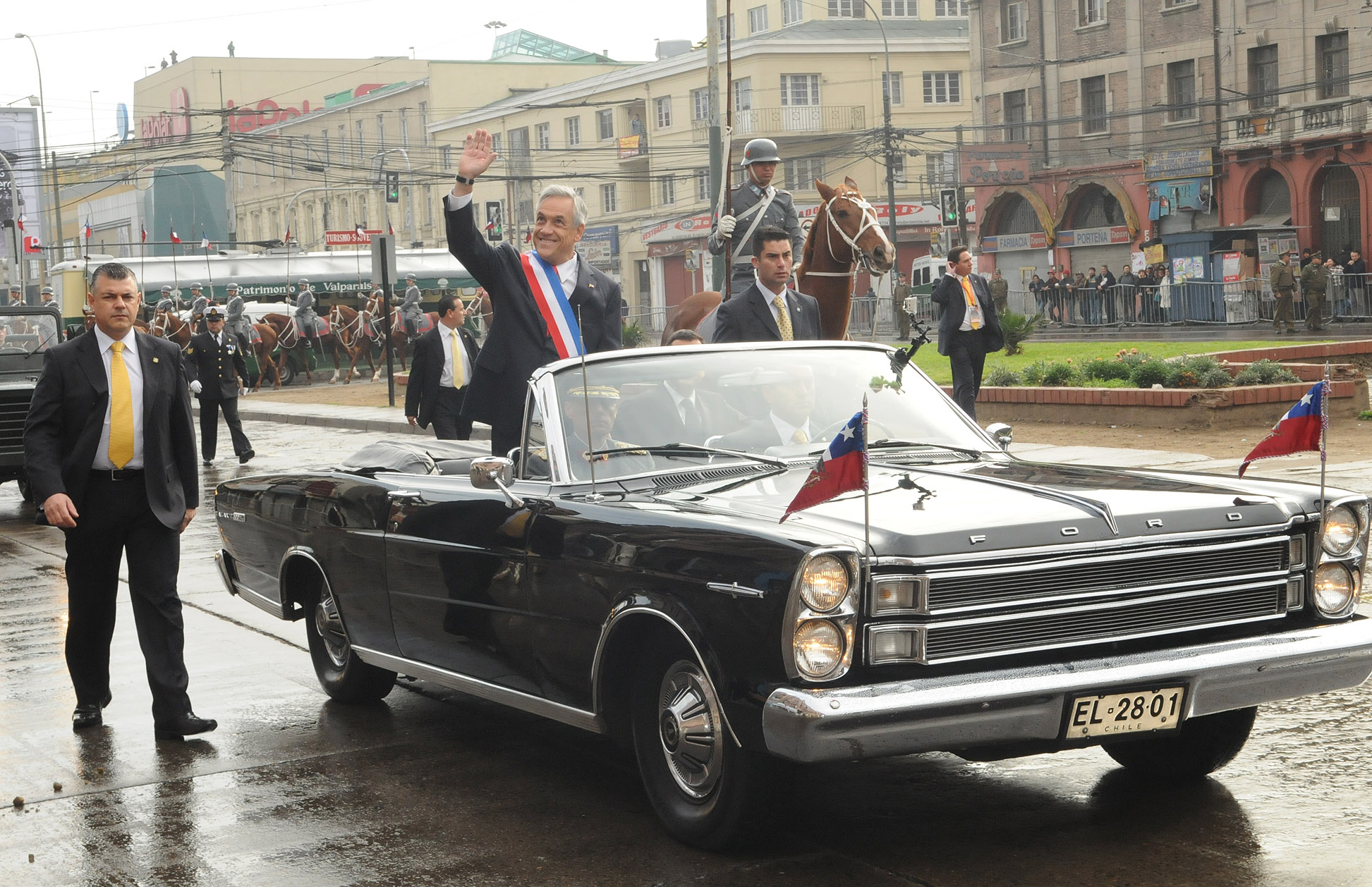
Sebastián Piñera in the Ford Galaxie on Navy Day 2011

== See also ==
- Vice President of Chile
- Presidents of Chile timeline
- 2025 Chilean presidential election
