= Bertram Thomas =

English civil servant and explorer (1892–1950)

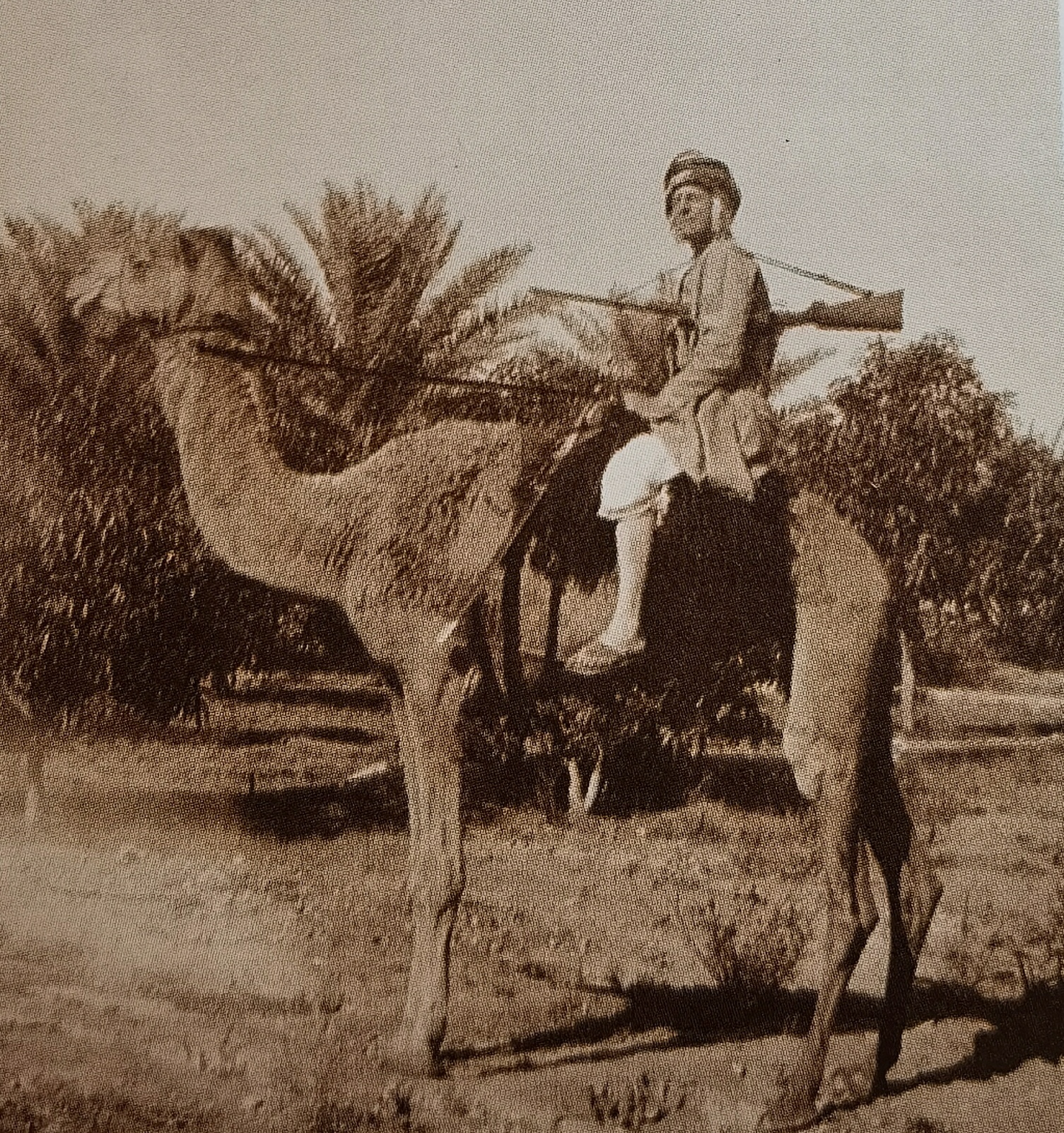
Bertram Thomas riding on his favorite camel "khawarah" during his trip from Sohar to Sharjah in 1927

Bertram Sidney Thomas (13 June 1892 – 27 December 1950) was an English diplomat and explorer who is the first documented Westerner to cross the Rub' al Khali (Empty Quarter). He was also a scientist who practiced craniofacial anthropometry.

== Biography ==
Bertram Thomas was born in Pill near Bristol and educated at Trinity College, Cambridge.

After working for the Civil Service in the General Post Office, he served in Belgium during World War I. He was commissioned in the Somerset Light Infantry in January 1916 and served in Mesopotamia (now Iraq) between 1916 and 1918. He worked as an Assistant Political Officer in this country from 1918 to 1922, and Assistant British Representative in Transjordan (now Jordan), from 1922 to 1924. He was appointed as Finance Minister and Wazir to Taimur bin Feisal, the Sultan of Muscat and Oman (now Oman), a post he held from 1925 to 1932. In this capacity, he undertook a number of expeditions into the desert, and became the first European to cross the Rub' al Khali guided by Bedouin of the Rashid tribe, from 1930 and 1931, a journey he recounted in Arabia Felix (1932), in which he described this desert's animals, inhabitants, and culture.

Besides Arabia Felix, Thomas wrote several other books, including The Arabs: The Epic Life Story of a People Who Have Left Their Deep Impress on the World (London: T. Butterworth, 1930; Garden City, New York: Doubleday, Doran and Co., Inc., 1937).

During World War II, Thomas headed the Middle East Centre for Arab Studies in Jerusalem, where British Army officers were taught Arabic language and culture.

He returned to England and died in the house in which he was born, in 1950 aged 58.

Two species of Omani reptiles are named in his honor, Platyceps thomasi and Uromastyx thomasi.

== Awards ==
He was awarded the OBE in 1920 and CMG in 1949. In 1932 he was also awarded the Livingstone Medal of the Royal Scottish Geographical Society. One of the Society's most prestigious awards, it is offered for outstanding service of a humanitarian nature with a clear geographical dimension.

== Film about Bertram Thomas ==
A recent film called Crossing the Empty Quarter was created by the Anglo-Oman Society's Chairman, Richard Muir — the ex-Ambassador to Oman — from footage taken by Thomas on his journey, and photographs from the Library of the Oriental Institute in Cambridge.

== Bibliography ==
- Arabia Felix (1932)
- The Arabs: The Epic Life Story of a People Who Have Left Their Deep Impress on the World (London: T. Butterworth, 1930; Garden City, New York: Doubleday, Doran and Co., Inc., 1937)

== Legacy ==
In 1986 The Crockerne Pill and District History Society together with his daughter unveiled a blue plaque at the house he was born in.

In January 2016 Mark Evans (explorer) completed a 55 day recreation of Thomas' original journey which he published in a book giving an overview of Thomas in the first chapter.
