= Grand Order of Honour (Oman) =

Omani order

Grand Order of Honour وسام الشرف الأعظم

Awarded by Sultan of Oman
- Type: State
- Established: 1982
- Country: Oman
- Royal house: Al Bu Sa'id
- Status: Currently constituted
- Founder: Sultan Qaboos bin Said
- Sovereign: Sultan Haitham bin Tariq

Precedence
- Next (higher): Grand Order of the Renaissance
- Next (lower): Order of Merit
- Ribbon bar of the order

The Grand Order of Honour (Arabic: وسام الشرف الأعظم, romanized: Wisam al-Sharaf al-Aezam), also called the Honourable Order of Oman, is an Omani order.

== History ==
The order was established in 1982 by Sultan Qaboos bin Said prior to his state visit to the United Kingdom. It is not divided into separate classes.

== Insignia ==
The insignia was created by Asprey and includes a collar, sash, breast star, and miniature. The badge is a twelve pointed star in white gold with a geometric design. The center is red enamel surrounded by a green then white enamel border with twelve red enamel star points all set in yellow gold. The star is of the same design but with pearls at the end of each point. The ribbon is red with green borders.

== Notable recipients ==
- Ali bin Majid al Ma'amari (1985)
- Sayyida Ahad bint Abdullah Al Busaidi (2025)
