= Grand Order of the Renaissance (Oman) =

Omani order

Grand Order of the Renaissance وسام النهضة الأعظم

Awarded by Sultan of Oman
- Type: State
- Established: 1982
- Country: Oman
- Royal house: Al Bu Sa'id
- Status: Currently constituted
- Founder: Sultan Qaboos bin Said
- Sovereign: Sultan Haitham bin Tariq

Precedence
- Next (higher): Order of the Renaissance
- Next (lower): Grand Order of Honour
- Ribbon bar of the order

The Grand Order of the Renaissance (Arabic: وسام النهضة الأعظم, romanized: Wisam al-Nahdat al-Aezam) is an order of Oman.

== History ==
The order was established in 1982 by Sultan Qaboos bin Said prior to his state visit to the United Kingdom. It is not divided into separate classes

== Insignia ==
The insignia was created by Spink & Son and consists of a collar, riband, badge, and star. The ribbon is green with a yellow and red striped border. The badge is a gold eight pointed star with petal shaped points bordered by diamonds. In between each petal is a small point with alternating rubies and emeralds. The center is green enamel with a white enamel border both with gold Arabic calligraphy. The star has the same design but with gold rays between each petal point.

== Notable recipients ==
- King Willem Alexander of the Netherlands (2012)
