= Claudio Vicuña Subercaseaux =

Chilean agriculturist and politician

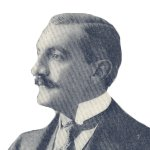

Minister of Agriculture, Industry and Colonization of Chile
- In office January 1 – July 27, 1925
- President: Arturo Alessandri
- Preceded by: Francisco Mardones Otaíza
- Succeeded by: Francisco Mardones Otaíza

Minister of Public Works, Commerce and Communications of Chile
- In office July 1 – July 27, 1925
- President: Arturo Alessandri

Minister of War and Navy of Chile
- In office August 8, 1912 – January 15, 1913
- President: Ramón Barros Luco
- Preceded by: Luis Devoto Arrizaga
- Succeeded by: Jorge Matte Gormaz

Member of the Chamber of Deputies
- In office 1915–1918
- Constituency: La Victoria and Melipilla
- In office 1912–1915
- Constituency: Santiago

Personal details
- Born: 1875 Santiago, Chile
- Died: May 21, 1956 (aged 81) Santiago, Chile
- Party: Liberal Democratic Party
- Spouse: Julia Ossa Lynch
- Children: 6
- Education: Colegio de los Padres Franceses
- Occupation: Agriculturist and politician

Claudio Vicuña Subercaseaux (1875 – May 21, 1956) was a Chilean farmer and politician, member of the Liberal Democratic Party. He served as a deputy and a state minister during the presidencies of presidents Ramón Barros Luco and Arturo Alessandri.

== Family and education ==
He was born in Santiago, Chile, in 1875, one of the seven children of Lucía Subercaseaux Vicuña and Claudio Vicuña Guerrero, who was a deputy and a state minister during the presidency of President José Manuel Balmaceda. He studied primary and secondary education at the Colegio de los Sagrados Corazones de Santiago.

He married Julia Ossa Lynch, with whom he had six children.

== Political career ==
In the political arena, he was a member of the Liberal Democratic Party, a party that, when divided into Alliance and Unionists, was among the former and served as president of that group in 1924 and 1925. Additionally, he was a member of the executive board of the same.

In the 1912 parliamentary elections, he ran as a candidate for deputy for Santiago, being elected for the legislative period 1912–1915. In his tenure, he was an effective collaborator in the Commission of Foreign Relations and Colonization, in the study of projects that he had to sponsor or let pass laws, for example, navigation with Austria; the embassy of the United States; reform of the consular law and others that were of utmost importance.

Parallel to this, during the government of President Ramón Barros Luco, on August 8, 1912, he was appointed as the titular Minister of National Defense, a position he held until January 15, 1913. During his tenure in office, aviation was created, the Aviation School was founded, and the decree of the fortifications of the country was signed. Likewise, at that time, he commissioned Armstrong House of England and Bethlehem of the United States, the largest caliber cannons that were located in the fortifications of Arica, Valparaíso, Iquique, and Talcahuano.

Later, in the 1915 parliamentary elections, he was re-elected as a deputy, but for La Victoria and Melipilla, for the period 1915–1918. On that occasion, he joined the Permanent Commission of War and Navy. On the other hand, he was one of the organizers of Chile's attendance at the San Francisco, California Exhibition in 1915, which failed due to the exceptional circumstances of public finance, which were caused by the World War I and the paralysis of the nation's sources of income: the import of saltpeter.

Later, in June 1924, he was appointed by President Arturo Alessandri as a state counselor. Subsequently, on January 29, 1925, he was appointed by the president of the Government Junta, Emilio Bello Codesido, as Minister of Agriculture, Industry, and Colonization, a position he held with the return to the presidency of Arturo Alessandri, until October 2 of the same year. Simultaneously, between July 1 and 27, he acted as Minister of Public Works, Commerce, and Communications, replacing Francisco Mardones Otaíza on an interim basis.

Among other activities, he was a member of the National Agricultural Society (SNA) and the Club de La Unión. He died in Santiago on May 21, 1956, at the age of 81.
