= Mark Evans (explorer) =

British writer, field guide and explorer (born 1961)

Mark Evans MBE
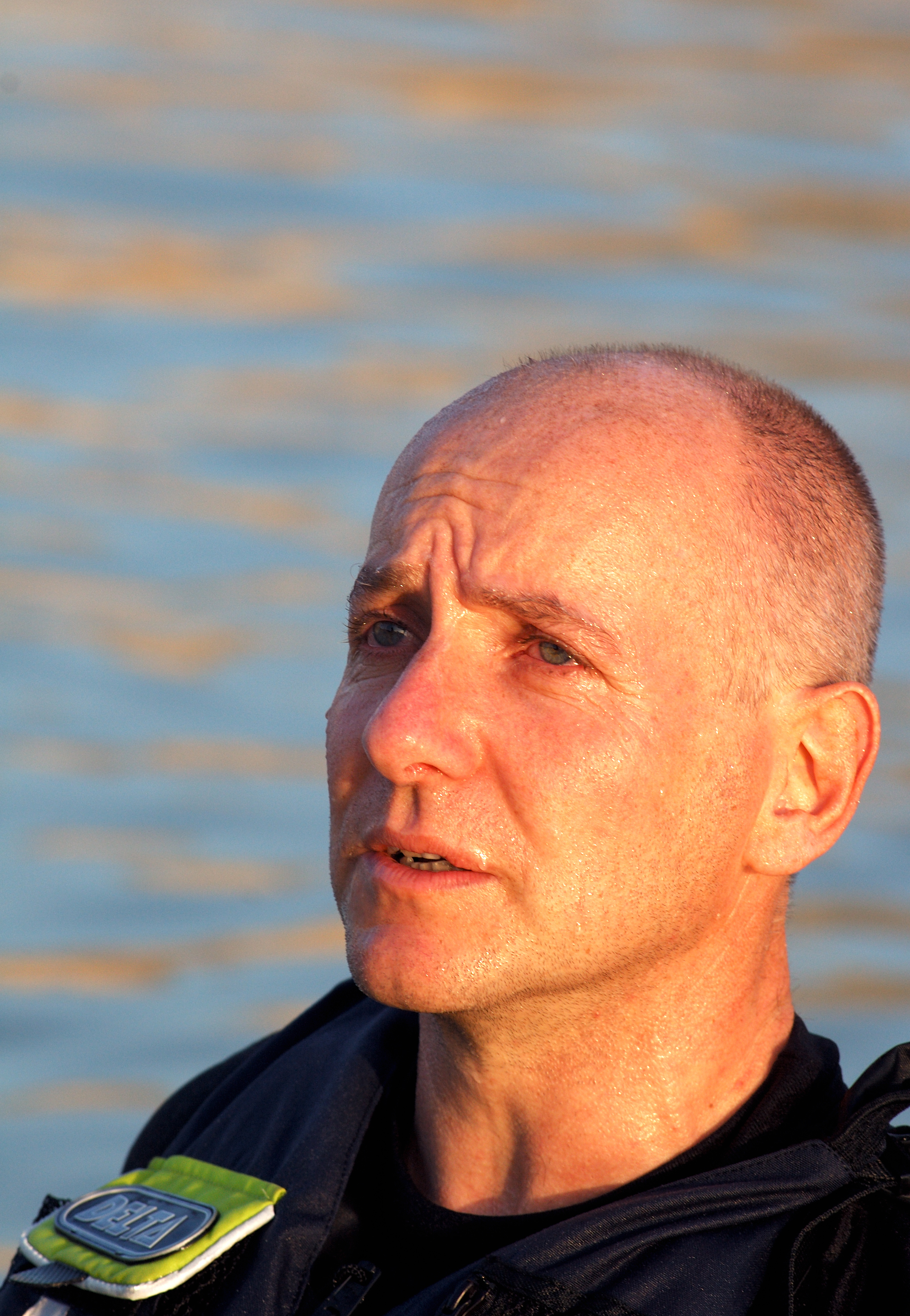
- Born: 28 May 1961 (age 65)
- Occupations: British explorer, field guide, author, motivational speaker and wilderness advocate

Mark Evans MBE (born 28 May 1961) is a British explorer, field guide, author, motivational speaker and wilderness advocate. He was awarded the MBE in 2011 for his work using outdoor journeys to connect cultures and promote intercultural dialogue between future leaders from the Arab and western world. He is currently General Manager of Outward Bound Oman. In January 2016 he completed a 49-day, 1300 km crossing of the largest sand desert on earth, on foot and by camel.

== Background ==
Born in Shropshire on 28 May 1961, and based in Muscat, Oman since 2003, Evans acts as a consultant in the fields of expedition logistics, risk mitigation and fund-raising. He is a Fellow of both the Explorers Club of New York, and the Royal Geographical Society in London.

Some twenty years spent living and traveling extensively in Arabia, including a 49-day, 1,300 km journey on foot and by camel across the Empty Quarter desert from Salalah to Doha, and an 80-day journey on camel and by traditional boat from Salalah to Muscat a 55-day 1,700 km solo kayak journey from UAE to Yemen and extended, remote 4x4 journeys throughout Saudi Arabia and Oman, give him knowledge of Oman, and the region.

Growing up in rural Shropshire saw Evans develop a passion for the outdoors. In 1979, at the age of 17 he was selected to take part in six-week scientific research and mountaineering expedition to the Lyngen Alps in Arctic Norway, organised by The British Exploring Society, for whom he went on to lead three extended research expeditions to Svalbard for young people, totalling 20 months in the field between 1992 and 2002, undertaking research for organisations such as the Wildfowl and Wetlands Trust, and Norwegian Polar Research Institute.

Evans attended Priory Grammar School for Boys in Shrewsbury, and graduated from Aberystwyth University in 1986, embarking on a 21-year career as a teacher of Geography in UK, Kenya, Bahrain, Saudi Arabia and Oman. In February 2009 he was appointed executive director of Outward Bound Oman (OBO), the first and only Outward Bound school in an Arabic speaking country. OBO is a not for profit foundation established by Ministerial Decree that delivers outcome focused challenging outdoor journeys in the mountains and deserts of Oman for young people, and the emerging and existing talent of leading corporates in the region.

== Expeditions ==
Since 1979, Evans has personally led or taken part in a number of expeditions to the ice deserts of the Arctic, and the sand deserts of Arabia.

In 1987 he ventured north on a six-week expedition to Svalbard, led by Commander Chris Furse OBE, this time as a field science leader with the same organisation, returning again in the summer of 1990 for a further six-week expedition, organised by The British Exploring Society. This expedition paved the way for an extended four-month research expedition led by Evans in 1992, the Patron being Colonel Andrew Croft, DSO, OBE.

In 1994, with fellow explorer Nigel Harling, Evans organised a two-man, parachute assisted crossing of the Greenland Ice Cap, from Amassalik to Sondre Stromfjord. In 1996 he returned to the Arctic as Expedition Leader of a 4-month research expedition to Svalbard, and in 1998, inspired by the exploits of William Edward Parry in search of the North West Passage, Evans led a team to the uninhabited Melville Island, in the North West Territories of Canada, recreating the first overland crossing by the British Royal Navy. The expedition was featured on BBC Radio 4, and in the Geographical Magazine.

Evans and Harling returned to the Arctic in 1999, again on the trail of William Edward Parry, this time on a two-man sea kayak expedition in Northern Svalbard in search of evidence of Parry's 1827 North Pole expedition, a journey supported by the Winston Churchill, Gino Watkins and Andrew Croft Memorial Funds.

One of Evans' more unusual projects saw him give up his career for 12 months to live in a small tent within 500 miles of the North Pole, for one year, in temperatures that fell to minus 37 degrees Celsius, with four months of total darkness. The Arctic Year expedition, led by Evans, and funded by IBM computers, involved 32 young people, and undertook research into seasonal affective disorder.

Paddling a Valley Nordkapp kayak, in 2003 Evans embarked on a 55-day, 1,700 km solo kayak journey around the coastline of Oman, from Musandam in northern Oman to the border with Yemen, a journey that raised 75,000 GBP for the National Cancer Awareness Association in Muscat, Oman.

Further explorations of the Persian Gulf took place with fundraising solo kayak journeys around Qatar in 2007, and Bahrain in 2008.

Exploration of Oman continued in January 2009 when, in partnership with New Zealand photographer John Smith, Evans undertook a 28-day expedition through the Empty Quarter, along the border between Saudi Arabia and Oman that ended at Umm As Samim, the mother of poisons quick-sands sought after by desert explorers Wilfred Thesiger and Bertram Thomas.

In January 2016, with several Arab companions, Evans recreated the first ever crossing of the Rub Al Khali, the largest sand desert on earth, some 85 years after the first crossing by British explorer, Bertram Thomas. At the time of the original journey in 1930, the western world, inspired by the exploits of TE Lawrence of Arabia, was obsessed with Arabia, and news of the first ever crossing made the front pages of the New York Times, and The Times in London. The 2015/16 journey covered 1300 km in 49 days. He documented this in a book filled with details and photographs (both of this journey, and historical from Thomas' archives), the differences to Thomas' original crossing, and with a foreword by Charles III.

== Awards and recognition ==
His creativity in the field of outdoor education and youth development saw Evans recognised as a Pioneer to the Life of the Nation at an event at Buckingham Palace in October 2003. In 2004, to address the polarisation of cultures between the Arab and Western worlds, Evans established the Connecting Cultures initiative, later recognised by the United Nations Alliance of Civilisations as one of the world's leading civil society initiatives. In the 2011 New Year's Honours List, Evans received an MBE for his services to intercultural understanding.

United Kingdom

- Order of the British Empire - Member (1 January 2011)

Oman

- Order of Honour (24 May 2023)

== Publications ==
- Mark Evans, 55 Days – a coastal navigation of Oman Apex Publishing, ISBN 9948-03-280-2
- Mark Evans, Desert Voices – a 28-day journey through the Empty Quarter of Oman., Al Roya Press, https://www.flickr.com/photos/43226761@N05/4082737351/
- Mark Evans, Connecting Cultures – Intercultural Dialogue in the Deserts of Oman., Muscat Press and Publishing, http://www.angloomanisociety.com/ckfinder/userfiles/files/Library%20Catalogue%20V3.pdf
- Mark Evans, The University of the Desert – using wilderness in Oman to bridge the cultural divide, International Journal of Wilderness December 2012 Volume 18 Number 3 p 35–40, http://ijw.org/wp-content/uploads/2012/03/Dec-2012-IJW-issue-web.pdf
- Geographical Magazine, A Passage of Time
- Geographical Magazine, Letters from High Latitudes – October 2002/June 2003
- Mark Evans, Crossing the Empty Quarter In the Footsteps of Bertram Thomas, Gilgamesh Publishing, ISBN 9781908531605
