= Military Order of Achievement =

Omani military order

Military Order of Achievement وسام الأمجاد العسكري

Awarded by Sultan of Oman
- Type: Military
- Established: 1995
- Country: Oman
- Royal house: Al Bu Sa'id
- Status: Currently constituted
- Founder: Sultan Qaboos bin Said
- Sovereign: Sultan Haitham bin Tariq
- Classes: Three

Precedence
- Next (higher): Order of the Special Royal Emblem
- Next (lower): Military Order of Merit
- Ribbon bar of the order

The Military Order of Achievement (Arabic: وسام الأمجاد العسكري, romanized: Wisam al-Amjad al-Easkarii), also called the Military Order of Glory, is an order of Oman.

== History ==
The order was established in 1995 by Sultan Qaboos bin Said to coincide with his 25th anniversary on the throne. It is made of three classes that are awarded to officers who have served for 25 years.

== Insignia ==
The insignia is made by Spink & Son. The first class has a collar, sash with badge, and star while the second class has a neck ribbon with badge and star and the third class only has a neck ribbon with badge. The ribbon is blue with a center red stripe and narrow white borders. The design of the badge and star are the same. It features the crown of Oman on red enamel with a blue enamel border surrounded by 25 palm fronds symbolizing Sultan Qaboos's 25 years on the throne.

== Notable recipients ==
=== First class ===
- Major General Salim bin Musallam bin Ali Qatan (2015)
- Major General Khalifa bin Abdullah Al Junaibi (2015)
- Lieutenant General Sayyid Mundhir bin Majid bin Said Al Said (2021)

=== Second class ===
- Commodore Mohammed bin Said Al Hinai (2015)
- Commodore Khalifa bin Hamad Al Qasimi (2015)
- Brigadier General Ahmed bin Abdullah Al Hasani (2015)
- Brigadier General Idris bin Abdulrahman Al-Kindi (2015)
- Brigadier General Nasser bin Saleh Al-Maawali (2015)
- Brigadier General Hafeez bin Amer Al Shanfari (2015)
- Brigadier General Saeed bin Faraj Al Rabie (2015)
- Brigadier General Muslim bin Salem Al Junaibi (2015)
- Brigadier General Abdullah bin Mohammed Al Hosni (2015)
- Brigadier General Rashid bin Salem Al Badi (2015)
- Brigadier General Uday bin Hilal Al Maawali (2015)
- Brigadier Engineer Mohammed bin Awad Al Rawas (2015)
- Brigadier Issa bin Saeed Al Kiyumi (2015)
- Brigadier Ahmed bin Darwish Al Zadjali (2015)
- Brigadier Abdullah bin Mohammed Al Jabri (2015)
- Brigadier Mohammed bin Yousef Al Harthy (2015)
- Colonel Suleiman bin Hamad Al Farsi (2015)
- Colonel Saif bin Zaher Al Salmi (2015)
- Colonel Abdullah bin Saleh Al Ghailani (2015)
- Colonel Badr bin Talib Al Shaqsi (2015)
- Colonel Saeed bin Mohammed Al Jabri (2015)
- Group Captain Salim bin Khalfan Al Aghbari (2015)
- Civil Officer Salim bin Badr Al Oufi (2015)
- Civil Officer Ahmed bin Musallam Al Rowas (2015)

=== Third class ===
- Lieutenant Colonel Khalfan bin Ali Al Maamari (2015)
