= July 1891 Chilean presidential election =

Election for the president of Chile

- 25 July 1891
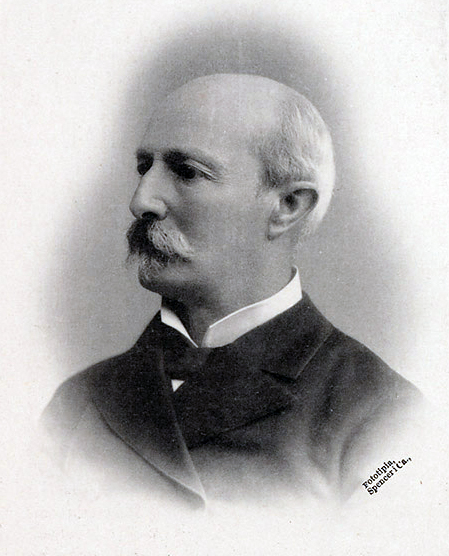
Candidate	Claudio Vicuña Guerrero
Party	Liberal Party
Electoral vote	255
Percentage	100%
Elected President
TBD

Indirect presidential elections were held in Chile on 25 July 1891. Claudio Vicuña Guerrero, a member of the Liberal Party, was elected president. However, he never took office and subsequently went into exile.

The election was carried out in accordance with the electoral law of 20 August 1890, which created the secret voting chamber and introduced vote folding. The election was also the first not to be under the control of the provincial intendant, who was designated by the central government, beginning to be managed by municipalities.

The elections took place in the last months of the government of José Manuel Balmaceda and in the middle of the Chilean Civil War of 1891. Vicuña was openly supported by Balmaceda, and had been nominated by the Partido Liberal in its convention of 8 March 1891. Due to the victory of his opponents in the Civil War, President-elect Vicuña was unable to take office.

== Bibliography ==
- Urzúa Valenzuela, Germán (1992). Histórica política de Chile y su evolución electoral desde 1810 a 1992. Santiago: Editorial Jurídica de Chile. p. 333.
