= Order of the Renaissance (Oman) =

Order of Oman

Order of the Renaissance وسام الرسوخ

Awarded by Sultan of Oman
- Type: State
- Established: 1973
- Country: Oman
- Royal house: Al Bu Sa'id
- Status: Currently constituted
- Founder: Sultan Qaboos bin Said
- Sovereign: Sultan Haitham bin Tariq
- Classes: three with fourth class medal

Precedence
- Next (higher): Order of His Majesty Sultan Qaboos bin Said
- Next (lower): Grand Order of the Renaissance
- Ribbon bar of the order

The Order of the Renaissance (Arabic: وسام نهضة عمان, romanized: Wisam al-Nahdat al-Oman) is an order of Oman.

== History ==
The order was instituted in 1973 by Sultan Qaboos bin Said as a unity or development medal. Three classes of the order where later created with the original medal becoming a separate fourth class. It is awarded to people who have contributed significantly to the development of Oman.

== Insignia ==
The insignia was created by Spink & Son with some changes over the years. The ribbon of the first three classes is white with a purple and green striped border. The first class has a star and sash ribbon with a badge, the second class has a star and a neck ribbon with a badge, and the third class has a neck ribbon with a badge. The badge is an eight pointed star with alternating purple and green enameled points and the national emblem of Oman in the center on a white enamel background with a green enamel border. The first class badge also has silver five pointed stars between each enameled point. The star is the same design as the badge with a background of silver rays behind the enameled points.

Fourth class ribbon

The fourth class is the original medal and has a different ribbon from the top three classes. It is twelve equal stripes of purple, green, and white with an eight pointed star of alternating purple and green as the pendant badge.

== Notable recipients ==
=== First class ===
- Princess Catharina Amalia, Princess of Orange (2025)

=== Second class ===
- Al Mutasim bin Hamood bin Nasr al Busaidi (1975)
- Salim bin Abdullah bin Ahmed al Ghazali (1975)
- Mohammed al Sayyid Mustafa al Nu’amani (2021)
- Abdullah bin Shaban Al Farsi (2021)

=== Third class ===
- Abdul Alim bin Mustahail al Rakhyoot (1976)

=== Fourth class ===
- Abdullah bin Ahmed bin Suhail Amergeed (1973)
- Ahmed bin Mohammad bin Salim al Amri (1973)
- Ahmed bin Said bin Ahmed al Hardan (1973)
- Hilal bin Fadhallah bin Musalim Tabook (1973)
- Mohammad bin Musalim bin Saif al Amri (1973)
- Musalim bin Ahmed bin Said Ali bin Bdr (1973)
- Mustahil bin Said bin Nasib al Shahri (1973)
- Said bin Ali bin Suhail Qattan (1973)
- Said bin Salim bin Ajham Jaboob (1973)
- Salim bin Ghareeb bin Sohail al Samhan (1973)
- Salim bin Musalim bin Ahmed al Masheni (1973)
