= O'Higgins Pioche =

Component of the Chilian presidential sash

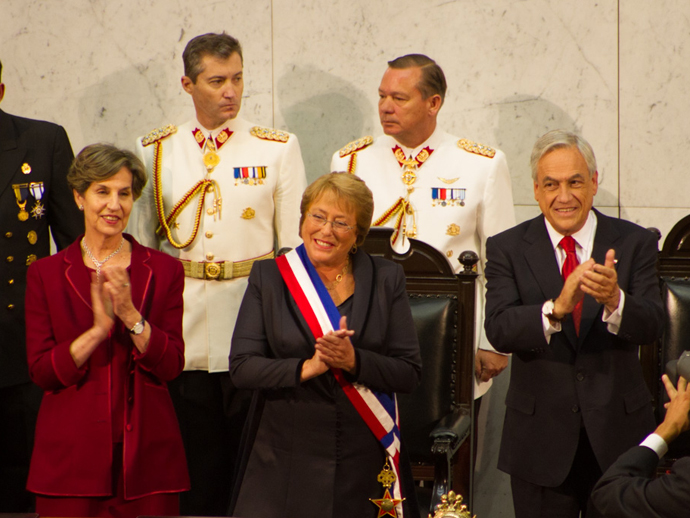
President Michelle Bachelet with presidential sash and the O'Higgins Pioche, 11 March 2014

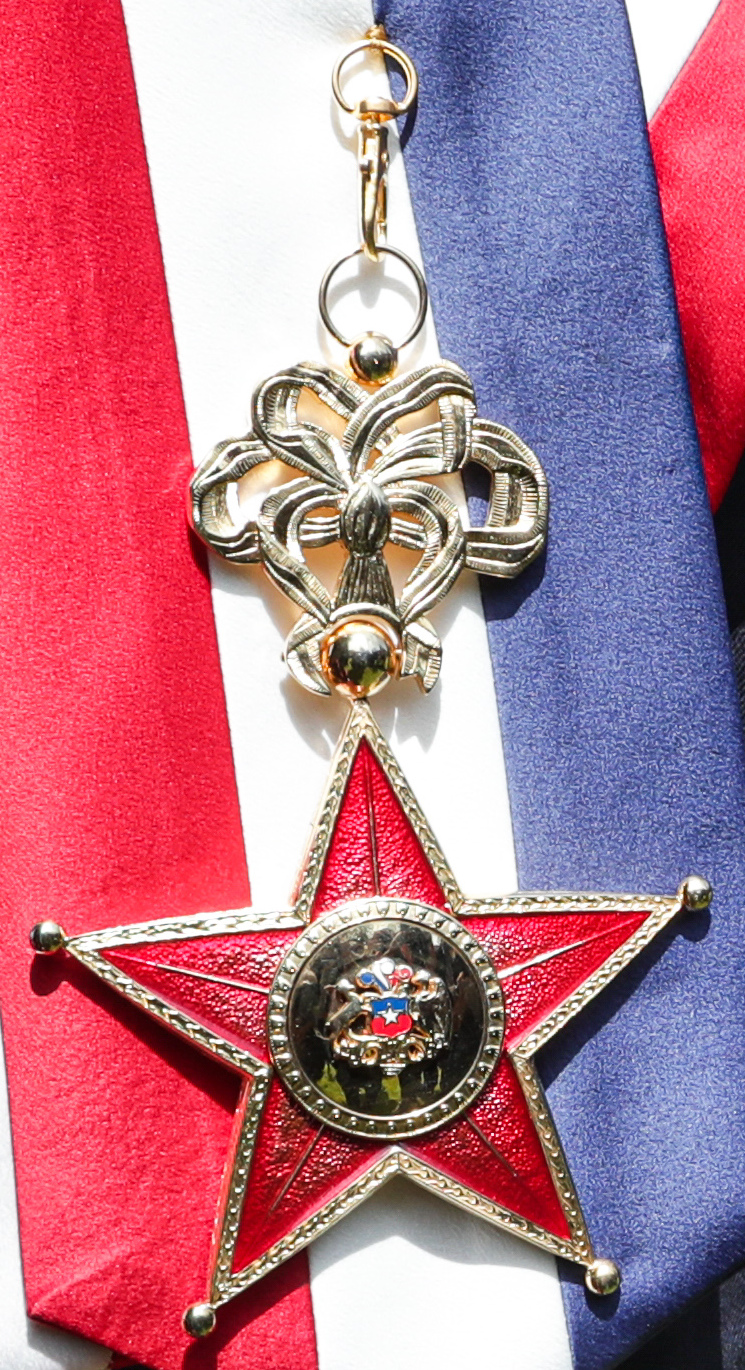
The O'Higgins Pioche

The O'Higgins Pioche is a pentagram-shaped gold piece of about 7 cm in diameter, enameled in red, placed in the lower end of the presidential sash of the president of Chile. It is regarded as the true symbol of presidential power in Chile.

This was the name given to a medal that Bernardo O'Higgins ordered to be put on the presidential sash. The relic was a gift by O'Higgins to José Gregorio Argomedo (1767–1830) after his abdication in January 1823. During the inauguration of the monument in the Alameda (1872), descendants of Argomedo gave it to President Federico Errázuriz Zañartu, who put it on the presidential sash in inaugurating a tradition that continues.

The original pioche remained intact until the 1973 coup, when it disappeared during the bombing of La Moneda Palace. During the military regime, a replica was made based on photographs of the original. The pioche is only to be used in conjunction with the presidential sash.

The "Pioche de O'Higgins" is the element that symbolizes the transfer of power from one president to the next one during the ceremony of change of command.

== See also ==
- Bernardo O'Higgins
- History of Chile
- Presidential sash
