= Order of the Special Royal Emblem =

Military order of Oman

Order of the Special Royal Emblem وسام الطغرائية السلطانية الخاصة

Awarded by Sultan of Oman
- Type: Military
- Established: 1985
- Country: Oman
- Royal house: Al Bu Sa'id
- Status: Currently constituted
- Founder: Sultan Qaboos bin Said
- Sovereign: Sultan Haitham bin Tariq

Precedence
- Next (higher): Military Order of Oman
- Next (lower): Military Order of Achievement
- Ribbon bar of the order for Omani officers Ribbon bar of the order for foreign officers

The Order of the Special Royal Emblem (Arabic: وسام الطغرائية السلطانية الخاصة, romanized: Wisam al-Tughrayiyat al-Sultaniat al-Khasa) is the second highest military order of Oman.

== History ==
The order was instituted in 1985 by Sultan Qaboos bin Said to coincide with the 15th anniversary of his accession to the throne. It was presented to Omani military officers on National Day in November of that year.

== Insignia ==
The insignia is a multicolored ribbon with a gold hexagonal badge featuring the Tughra of Sultan Qaboos. A Tughra is a royal seal of the Sultan's name in Arabic calligraphy. Sultan Qaboos' Tughra reads Al-Wathiq Billah (Arabic: الواثق بالله, romanized: al-Wāthiq biʾllāh, lit. 'He who trusts in God') His Majesty Sultan Qaboos bin Said bin Taimur bin Faisal Al Said and was designed by calligrapher, Sheikh Hilal bin Mohammed bin Salem Al Rawahy.

Another version was made for foreign military officers that has a silver badge featuring the national emblem of Oman
