= Orders, decorations, and medals of Oman =

Omani orders and medals

The Orders, decorations, and medal of Oman are the orders awarded by the Sultan of Oman. The first Omani order was created by Sultan Taimur bin Faisal in 1913 but it fell into disuse during his successor's reign. Sultan Said bin Taimur created some military medals but the current system was created by Sultan Qaboos bin Said throughout his fifty years on the throne. The statutes of the orders were codified by Royal Decree No. 7/2011 and amended by No. 70/2012.

As the current sovereign, all awards are approved by Sultan Haitham bin Tariq with recommendations from the Diwan of the Royal Court for civilian orders and the Royal Office for military orders.

== Civilian Orders ==
No.	Ribbon	Name in English	Name in Arabic	Established	Classes	Notes
1		Order of Al Said	وسام آل سعيد	1913	1	
2		Civil Order of Oman	وسام عمان المدني	1970	5	
3		Order of Establishment	وسام الرسوخ	2010	3	
4		Order of Sultan Qaboos	وسام السلطان قابوس	1985	3	
5		Order of Royal Commendation	وسام الإشادة السلطانية	2007	3	
6		Order of His Majesty Sultan Qaboos bin Said	وسام صاحب الجلالة السلطان قابوس بن سعيد المعظم	1978	1	no longer awarded
7		Order of the Renaissance	وسام نهضة عمان	1974	3	
8		Grand Order of the Renaissance	وسام النهضة الأعظم	1982	1	no longer awarded
9		Grand Order of Honour	وسام الشرف الأعظم	1982	1	no longer awarded
10		Order of Merit	وسام الاستحقاق	1983	2	
12		Order of Al Nu'man	وسام النعمان	1982	3	
13		Order of Honour	وسام التكريم	1990	1	
14		Order of Excellence	وسام الامتياز	1982	1	
15		Sultan Qaboos Order for Culture, Science and Art	وسام السلطان قابوس للثقافة والعلوم والفنون	1990	3	
16		Order of Merit for Culture, Science, Arts, and Literature	وسام الاستحقاق للثقافة والعلوم والفنون والآداب	1982	3	
17		Order of Appreciation for Good Civil Service	وسام التقدير للخدمة المدنية الجيدة	1990	2	

== Military orders ==
No.	Ribbon	Name in English	Name in Arabic	Established	Classes	Notes
1		Military Order of Oman	وسام عمان العسكري	1970	5	
2		Order of the Special Royal Emblem	وسام الطغرائية السلطانية الخاصة	1985	1	no longer awarded
3		Military Order of Achievement	وسام الأمجاد العسكري	1995	3	
4		Military Order of Merit	وسام الاستحقاق العسكري	1995	3	
