= President-elect of Chile =

Chilean political title

- Presidente electo de Chile
- Style: His / Her Excellency
- Residence: In their own residence until inauguration day
- Term length: Period between the certification of the final election results and the taking office as President of Chile.
- Inaugural holder: Manuel Blanco Encalada
- Formation: 8 July 1826

The President-elect of Chile is the title used to refer to the winning candidate of the presidential elections in Chile, in the period between the announcement of the election results and the assumption of office. The president-elect officially takes office on March 11 of the year following the election, at which point they become the constitutional President of Chile.

The first president elected in Chile under the title of President of the Republic was Manuel Blanco Encalada in 1826. However, the modern system of direct presidential elections was established later.

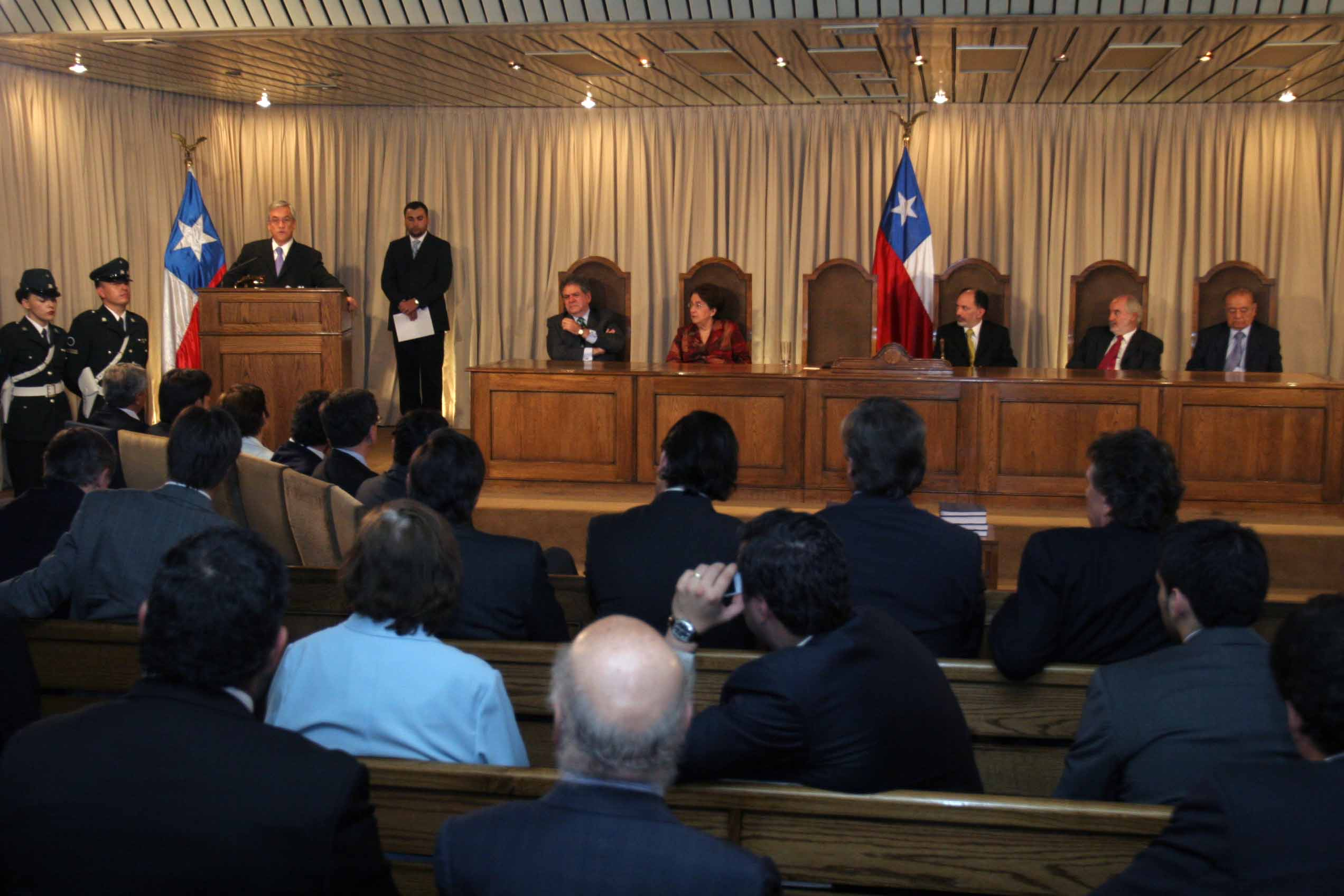
The TRICEL proclaiming Sebastián Piñera as President-elect in 2010.

According to Article 26 of the Constitution of Chile, the president is elected by direct vote for a term of four years. The candidate who obtains more than half of the valid votes in the first round is declared elected. If no candidate achieves an absolute majority, a second round (runoff) is held between the two candidates with the most votes, and the one who receives the majority of valid votes is elected. Once the election results are confirmed by the Electoral Service of Chile (SERVEL), the president-elect is still not formally recognized, but still may begin the transition process. The President-elect is formally proclaimed by the Election Certification Court (TRICEL) after the presidential election qualification process. This process must be completed within 15 days following the first or second round of voting, as applicable. Once the TRICEL has made the proclamation, it must immediately notify the President of the Senate. Therefore, to acquire the status of president-elect, the announcement of the results by the Electoral Service (SERVEL) alone is not sufficient.

During the transition period, the outgoing president organizes a series of meetings and briefings with the president-elect and their team. The transition process is essential to ensure continuity in government policies and to facilitate the assumption of power. In Chile, the transition period lasts approximately three months, from the confirmation of the election results to March 11, when the new president takes office before the National Congress in a formal ceremony held in Valparaíso.

== List ==
Below is a list since the return to democracy in 1990:

Order	President-elect	Following
1	Patricio Aylwin	Election of 1989
2	Eduardo Frei Ruiz-Tagle	Election of 1993
3	Ricardo Lagos	Election of 1999–2000
4	Michelle Bachelet	Election of 2005–06
5	Sebastián Piñera	Election of 2009–10
6	Michelle Bachelet	Election of 2013
7	Sebastián Piñera	Election of 2017
8	Gabriel Boric	Election of 2021
9	José Antonio Kast	Election of 2025
