= State order =

Honour awarded to an individual recipient by a state

A state order, or national order, is an order that is granted by a sovereign state as part of its national honours system. These orders, which are generally awarded to recipients for their accomplishments, are typically categorised as either orders of chivalry or orders of merit.

Orders that are bestowed by formerly reigning dynasties are not considered to be state orders per se, but they can be referred to as dynastic orders.

== See also ==
- State decoration
