= Daniel Pratt Cemetery =

United States historic place in Autauga County, Alabama

- Daniel Pratt Historic District
- U.S. Historic district – Contributing property
- Alabama Register of Landmarks and Heritage
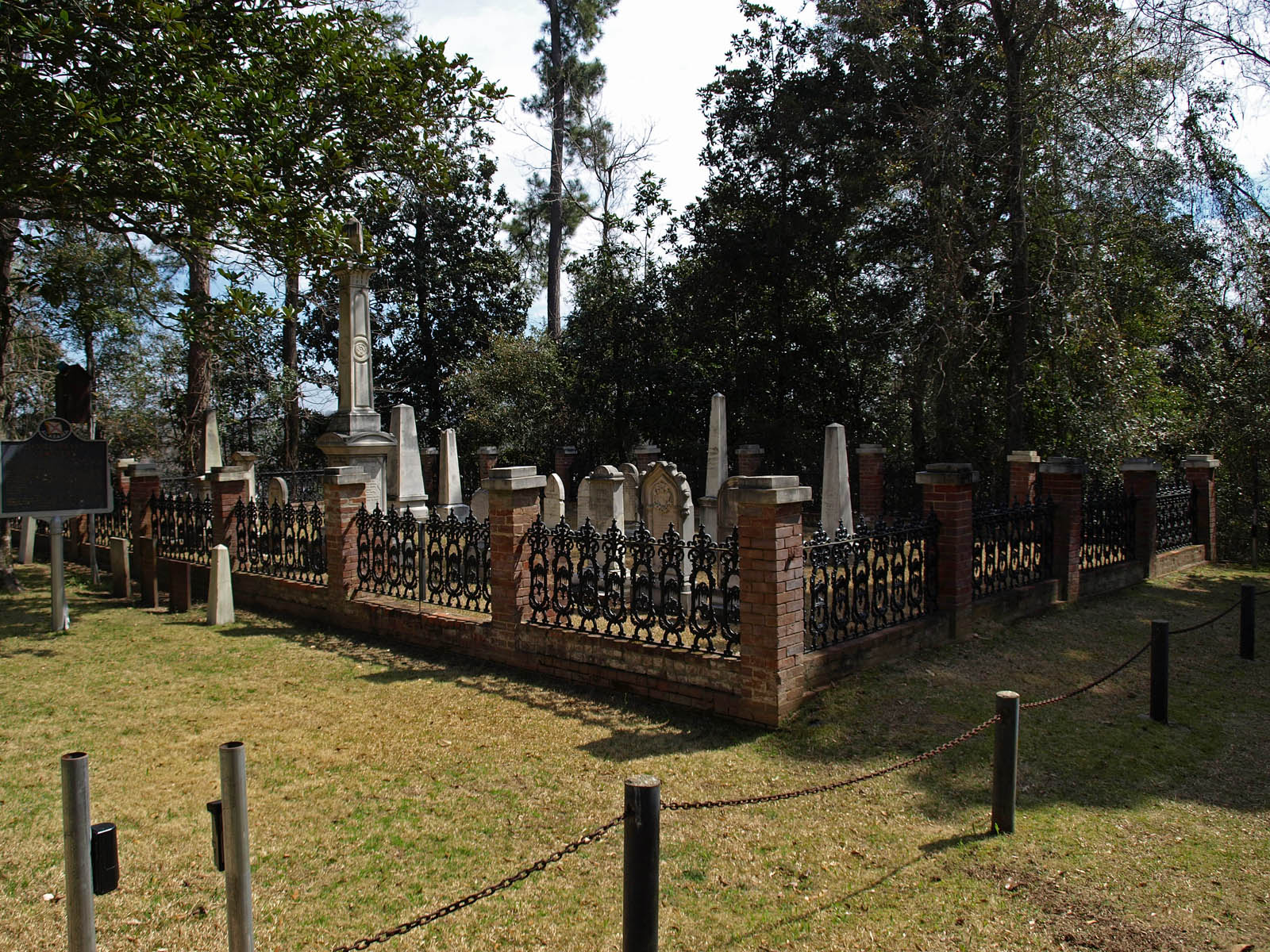
- Cemetery in March 2010

- Location within Alabama
- Location: Roughly bounded by Northington Road, 1st, 6th, Bridge, and Court Streets, Prattville, Autauga County, Alabama
- Coordinates: 32°27′32″N 86°28′44″W
- Part of: Daniel Pratt Historic District (ID84000596)

Significant dates
- Designated CP: August 30, 1984
- Designated ARLH: September 14, 1977

Daniel Pratt Cemetery is a historical burial place in Prattville, Alabama. The cemetery dates from 1849 to 1886. It is located roughly bounded by Northington Road, 1st, 6th, Bridge, and Court Streets. The cemetery is a contributing property on the Daniel Pratt Historic District. It is also listed on the Alabama Register of Landmarks and Heritage on September 14, 1977.

== Notable burials ==
- Daniel Pratt (1799–1873), industrialist, founder of Pratt Gin Company
- George Cooke (1793–1849), painter
- Esther Ticknor Pratt (1808–1875), wife of Daniel Pratt
- John W. Gulick (1805–1847), artist
- William H. Fay (1841–1864), Private of the Confederate States Army

== Gallery ==
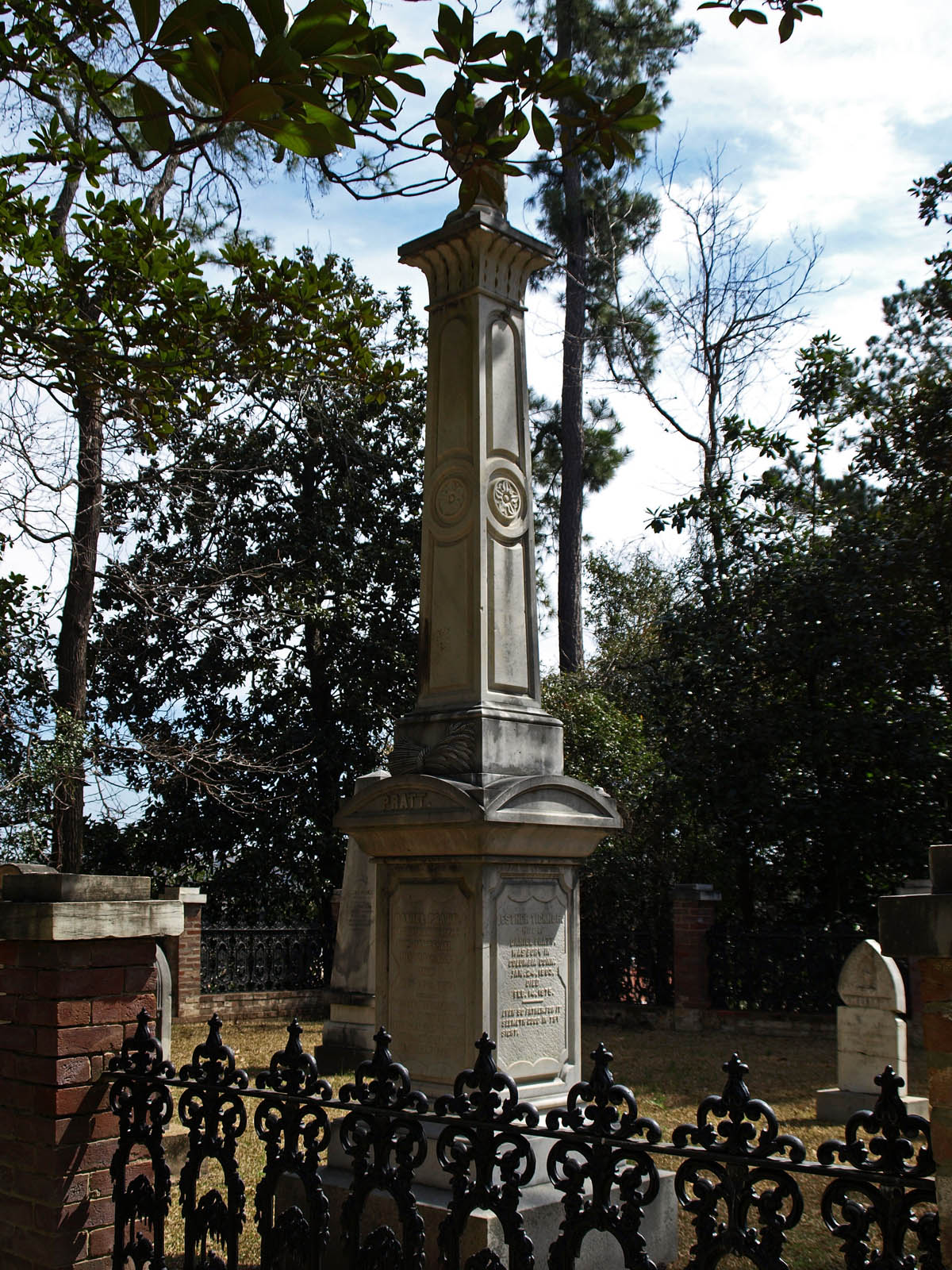
Grave of Daniel Pratt (1799–1873)

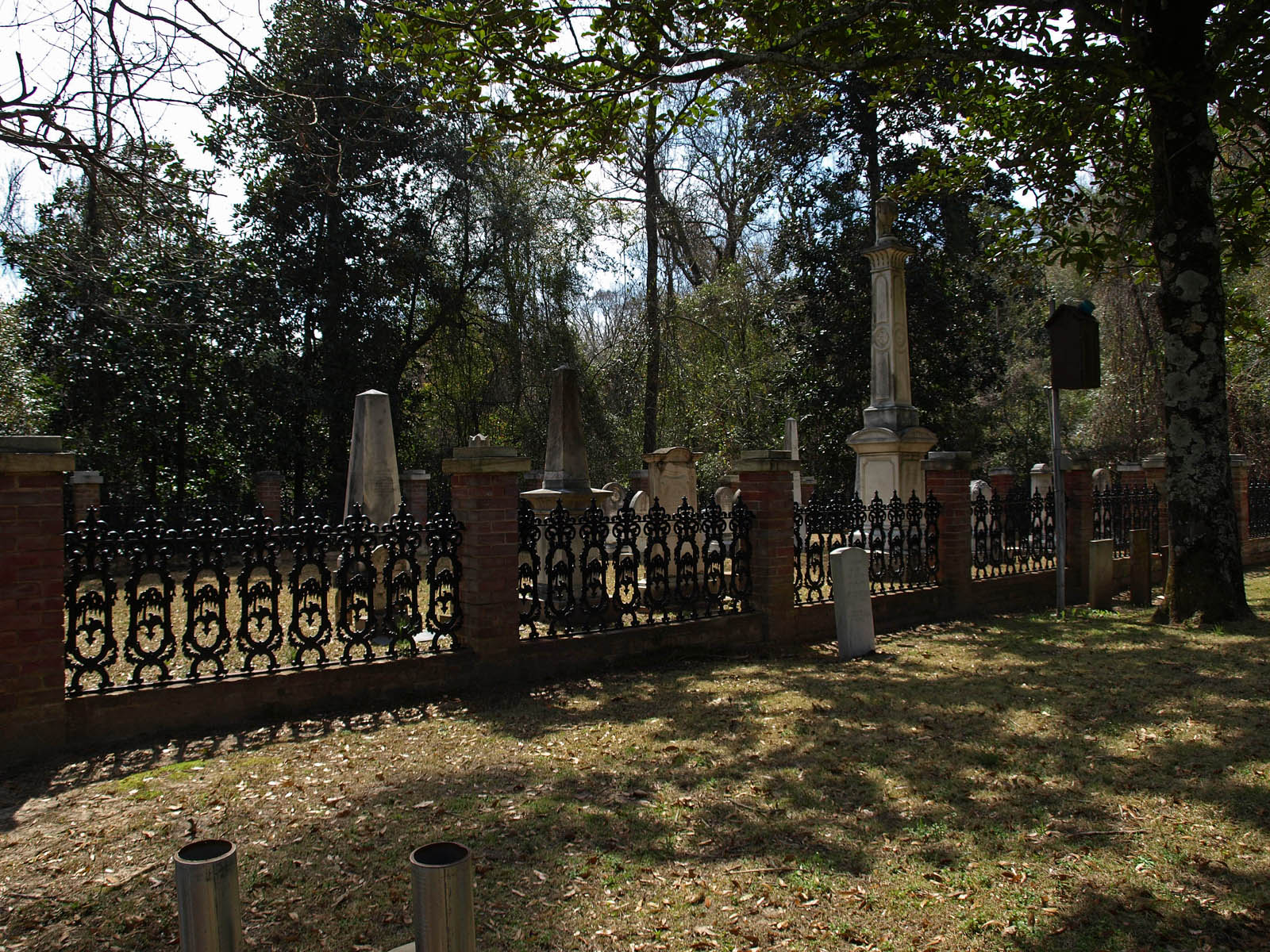

== See also ==
- National Register of Historic Places listings in Autauga County, Alabama
