= Albert Scott Crossfield =

American test pilot (1921–2006)

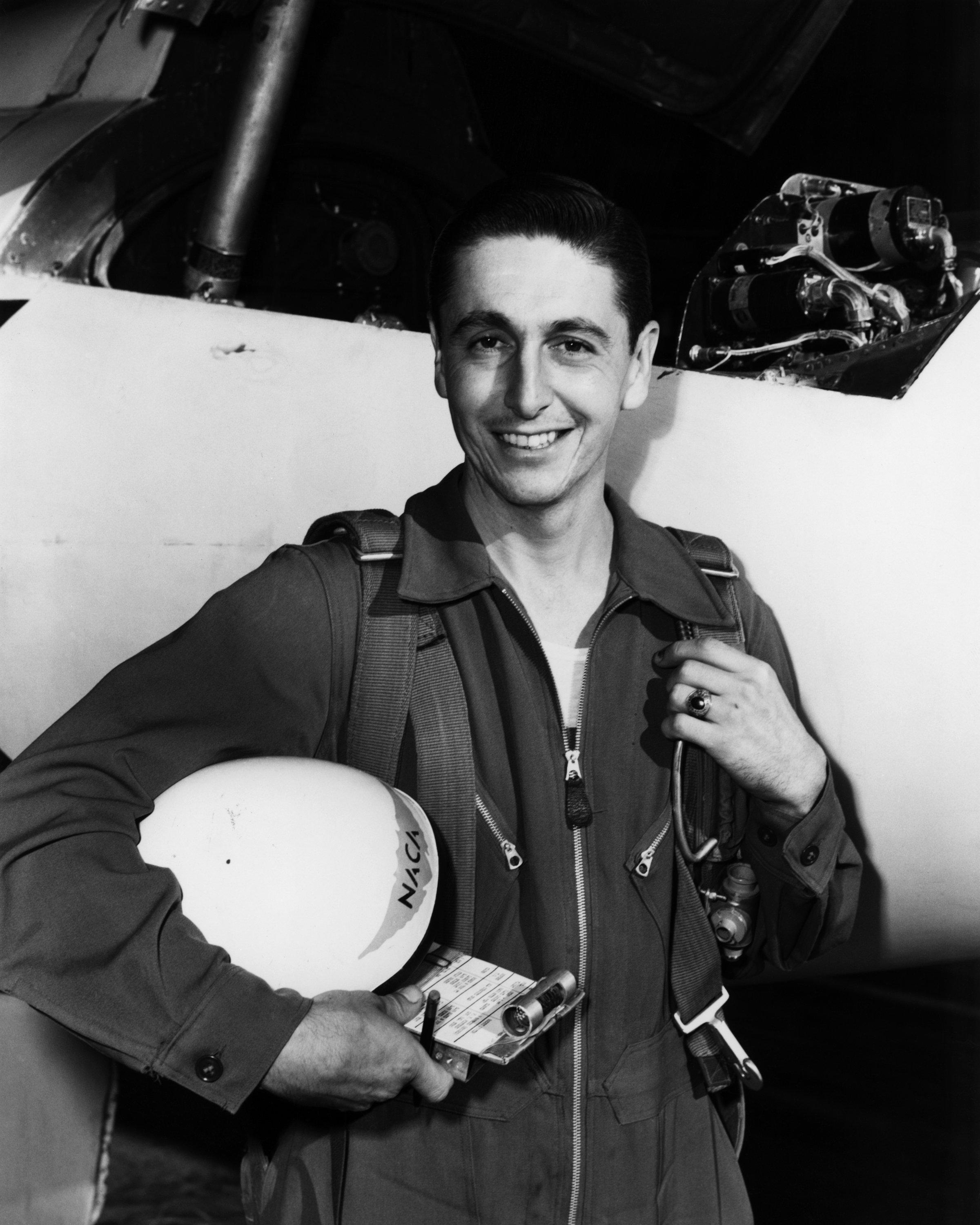
- Crossfield in 1953
- Born: October 2, 1921; Berkeley, California, U.S.
- Died: April 19, 2006 (aged 84); Ludville, Pickens County, Georgia, U.S.
- Resting place: Arlington National Cemetery
- Education: University of Washington (B.S. 1949, M.S. 1950)
- Occupations: USN-NACA-NAR, Test Pilot, Astronaut-Select
- Space career
- Previous occupation: Test pilot
- Selection: 1957 MISS Group
- Mission: None
- Retired: December 6, 1960
- Military career
- Allegiance: United States
- Branch: United States Navy
- Years: c. 1943–46
- Rank: Lieutenant

Albert Scott Crossfield (October 2, 1921 – April 19, 2006) was an American naval officer and test pilot. In 1953, he became the first pilot to fly at twice the speed of sound. Crossfield was the first of twelve pilots who flew the North American X-15, an experimental spaceplane jointly operated by the United States Air Force and NASA. He is the subject of a biography called "Always Another Dawn."

== Early years ==
Born October 2, 1921, in Berkeley, California, Scott Crossfield grew up in southern California and rural southwest Washington, a son of Albert Scott Crossfield, Sr. (May 13, 1887 – October 21, 1954) and his first wife Maria Lucia Dwyer (March 8, 1892 – March 23, 1960).

Crossfield graduated from Boistfort High School southwest of Chehalis, attended the University of Washington in Seattle, then worked for Boeing. He served with the U.S. Navy as a flight instructor and fighter pilot during World War II. During this time, he flew the F6F Hellcat and F4U Corsair fighters, as well as SNJ trainers, and a variety of other aircraft. He married Alice Virginia Knoph (June 27, 1920 – September 23, 2015) on 21 April 1943 in Corpus Christi, Texas. She was of Norwegian descent and had attended Garfield High School in Seattle. From 1946 to 1950, he worked in the University of Washington's Kirsten Wind Tunnel while earning his Bachelor of Science and Master of Science degrees in aeronautical engineering in 1949 and 1950, respectively. Their son Paul Stanley Crossfield was born in 1952 while the Crossfields resided in California.

== NACA career ==
In 1950, Crossfield joined the National Advisory Committee for Aeronautics' (NACA) High-Speed Flight Station (later named the NASA Dryden Flight Research Center and then the Neil A. Armstrong Flight Research Center) at Edwards Air Force Base, California, as an aeronautical research pilot.

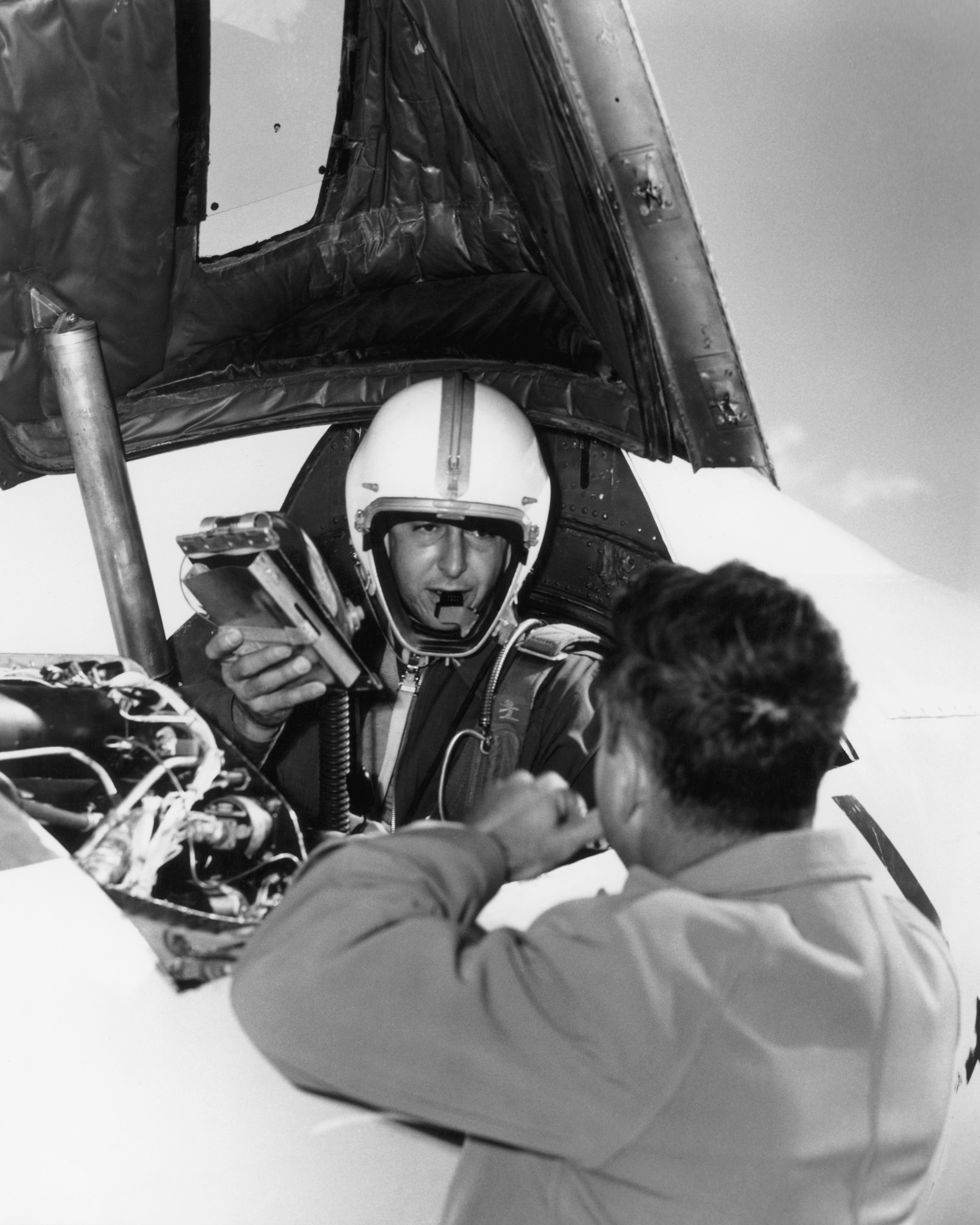
Crossfield in the cockpit of a Douglas D-558-II Skyrocket in November 1953

Crossfield demonstrated his flight test skills on his very first student solo. His instructor was not available on the designated early morning, so Crossfield, on his own, took off and went through maneuvers he had practiced with his instructor, including spin entry and spin recovery. During the first spin, Crossfield experienced vibrations, banging, and noise in the aircraft that he had never encountered with his instructor. He recovered, climbed to a higher altitude, and repeated his spin entry and spin recovery, getting the same vibration, banging and noise. On his third spin entry, at yet an even higher altitude, he looked over his shoulder as he was spinning and observed the instructor's door disengaged and flapping in the spin. He reached back, pulled the door closed, and discovered all the vibrations, banging and noise stopped. Satisfied, he recovered from the spin, landed, and fueled the airplane. He also realized his instructor had been holding the door during their practice spin entries and recoveries, and never mentioned this door quirk. In later years, Crossfield often cited his curiosity about this solo spin anomaly and his desire to analyze what was going on and why it happened, as the start of his test pilot career.

Over the next five years, he flew nearly all of the experimental aircraft under test at Edwards, including the X-1, XF-92, X-4, X-5, Douglas D-558-I Skystreak, and the Douglas D-558-II Skyrocket. During one of his X-1 flights, the cockpit windows completely frosted and Crossfield was literally flying blind. Ever resourceful, he removed a loafer and used his sock to wipe a hole in the ice to spot his chase pilot. On November 20, 1953, he became the first to fly at twice the speed of sound as he piloted the Skyrocket to a speed of 1,291 mph (2,078 km/h, Mach 2.005). The Skyrocket D-558-II surpassed its intended design speed by 25 percent on that day. With 99 flights in the rocket-powered X-1 and D-558-II, Crossfield had—by a wide margin—more experience with rocketplanes than any other pilot in the world by the time he left Edwards to join North American Aviation in 1955.

In September 1954, Crossfield was forced to make a deadstick landing in the North American F-100 Super Sabre he was evaluating at the High-Speed Flight Station (the Neil A. Armstrong Flight Research Center), a feat which North American's own test pilots doubted could be done, as the F-100 had a high landing speed. Crossfield made a perfect approach and touchdown, but was unable to bring the unpowered aircraft to a halt in a safe distance, and was forced to use the wall of the NACA hangar as a makeshift brake after narrowly missing several parked experimental aircraft ("with great precision," as he later wryly joked). Crossfield was uninjured, and the F-100 was later repaired and returned to service. Crossfield left NACA in 1955.

== North American Aviation career ==
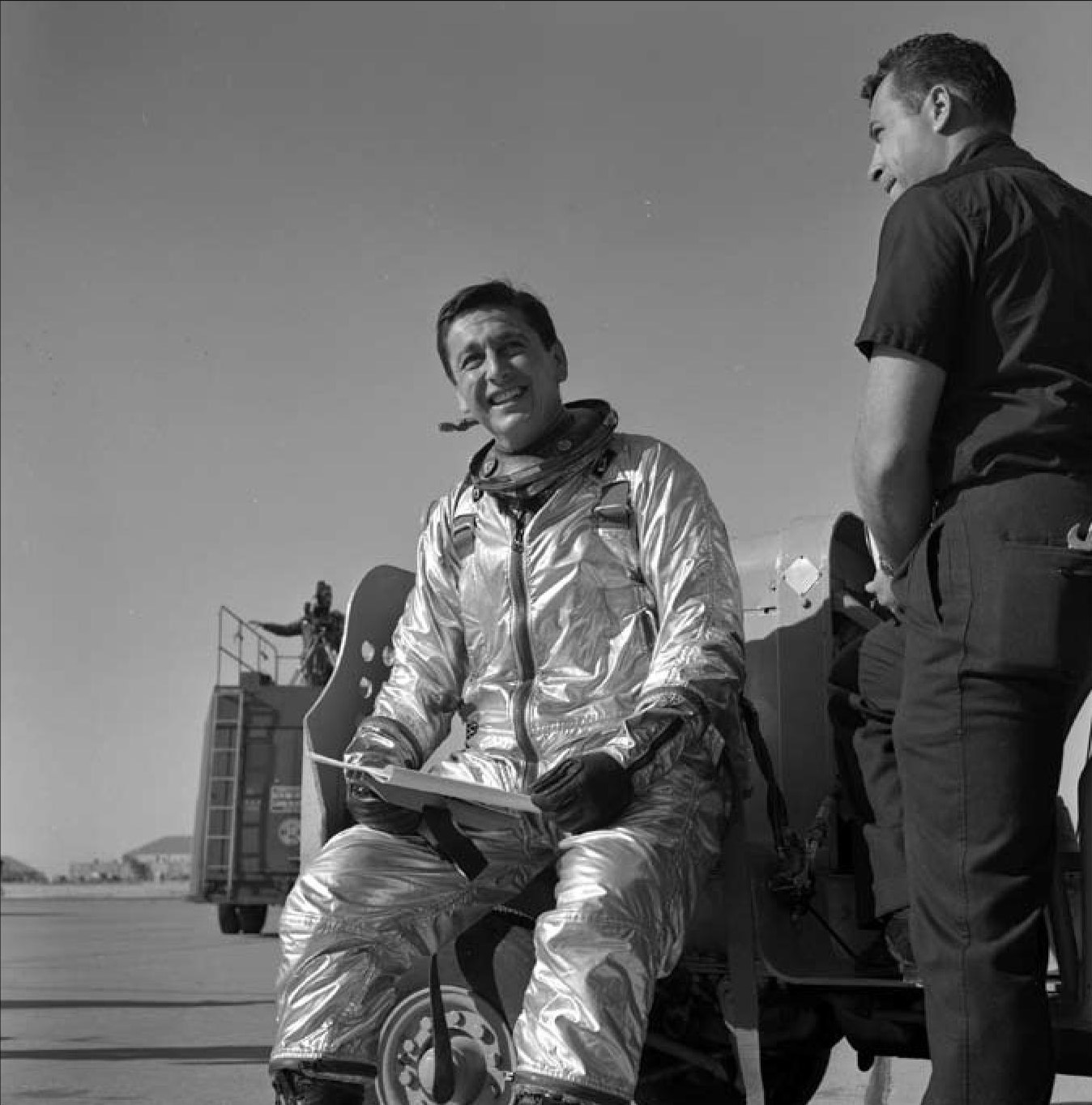
Crossfield in X-15 suit

As chief engineering test pilot for North American, Crossfield played a major role in the design and development of the North American X-15 and its systems. Once it was ready to fly, it was his job to demonstrate its airworthiness at speeds ranging up to Mach 3 (2,290 mph). Because the X-15 and its systems were unproven, these tests were considered extremely hazardous. Crossfield flew 14 of the 199 total X-15 flight tests with most of these tests establishing and validating initial key parameters. Crossfield was not only involved with the design of X-15 from the beginning, but introduced many innovations, including putting engine controls of the rocket plane into the cockpit. Previously, all engine adjustments resulted from technicians making adjustments on the ground based upon results of flight profiles.

It was during this time that Crossfield was part of the U.S. Air Force's Man In Space Soonest project.

On June 8, 1959, he completed the airplane's first flight, an unpowered glide from 37,550 feet. The flight was troubled as the flight controls had not been set up properly. As Crossfield attempted to land the unfueled X-15, it went into what Crossfield described as "a classic PIO" or pilot induced oscillation. He managed to set down the X-15 on the desert runway at the bottom of one of the severe oscillations saving himself and the airframe. On September 17, 1959, he completed the first powered flight. Because of delays in the development of the X-15's mammoth 57,000 pounds force (254 kN) thrust XLR-99 engine, the early flights were completed with a pair of interim XLR-11 rocket engines.

Shortly after launch on his third flight, one of these engines exploded. Unable to jettison his propellants, Crossfield was forced to make an emergency landing during which the excessive load on the aircraft broke its back just behind the cockpit. He was uninjured and the airplane was repaired.

On June 8, 1960, he had another close call during ground tests with the XLR-99 engine. He was seated in the cockpit of the No. 3 X-15 when a malfunctioning valve caused a catastrophic explosion. Once again he was uninjured as Dr. Toby Freedman, NAA Medical Director, pried open the cockpit to save him and despite being subjected to a later calculated acceleration force of near 50 Gs (although Crossfield stated in the Discovery Channel's series Frontiers of Flight that he began to have debilitating issues with his night vision after the accident) and the airplane was completely rebuilt. On November 15 of the same year, he completed the X-15's first powered flight with the XLR-99 engine. Two flights later, on December 6, he brought North American's demonstration program to a successful conclusion as he completed his final flight in the X-15. Although it had been his hope to eventually pilot one of the craft into space, the USAF would not allow it, and gave strict orders which basically amounted to "stay in the sky, stay out of space."

Altogether, he completed 16 captive flights (mated to the B-52 launch aircraft), one glide flight and 13 powered flights in the X-15. The retirement of the X-15 (due to funding cutbacks) after its record-setting Mach 6.70 (4,520 mph) flight prompted pilot Pete Knight to remark that he would have pushed it to even faster speeds if he knew it was the last flight. In his remarks to a number of aviation groups, Crossfield cited the X-15 as one of few aircraft that caused grown men to cry upon its retirement.

He remained at North American as systems director of test and quality assurance in the company's Space and Information Systems Division where he oversaw quality, reliability engineering and systems test activities for such programs as the Apollo command and service modules and the Saturn S-II booster. In 1966, he became the division's technical director for research engineering and test.

== Civilian career ==
In 1961, Crossfield became division director of test and quality assurance for NAA's Paraglider project.

In 1967, Crossfield joined Eastern Air Lines where he served as a division vice president for research and development and, subsequently, as a staff vice president working with U.S. military and civilian agencies on air traffic control technologies.

In 1974–1975, he worked for Hawker Siddeley as a senior vice president supporting HS146 activities in the United States. In 1977, he joined the United States House of Representatives Committee on Science and Technology where he served, until his retirement in 1993, as a technical adviser on all aspects of civil aviation research and development and became one of the nation's leading advocates for a reinvigorated research airplane program. In 1986, this House Committee tasked Crossfield to be a member of the task group assigned to investigate the Space Shuttle Challenger disaster.

In a 2000 public lecture, Crossfield described how the X-15 aeronautical calculations and design required computing power that filled four 10'x12' rooms. He went on to say that these very same calculations could be performed today on a notebook computer. He also hinted that Burt Rutan and his Scaled Composite company were performing pioneering work for a private aircraft to take-off from an airport, fly into outer space, and return to that airport. In 2004, White Knight carried Space Ship One to its successful launch and winning of the Ansari X-Prize, the first attempt by a plane since the X-15 cancellation.

== Later life ==
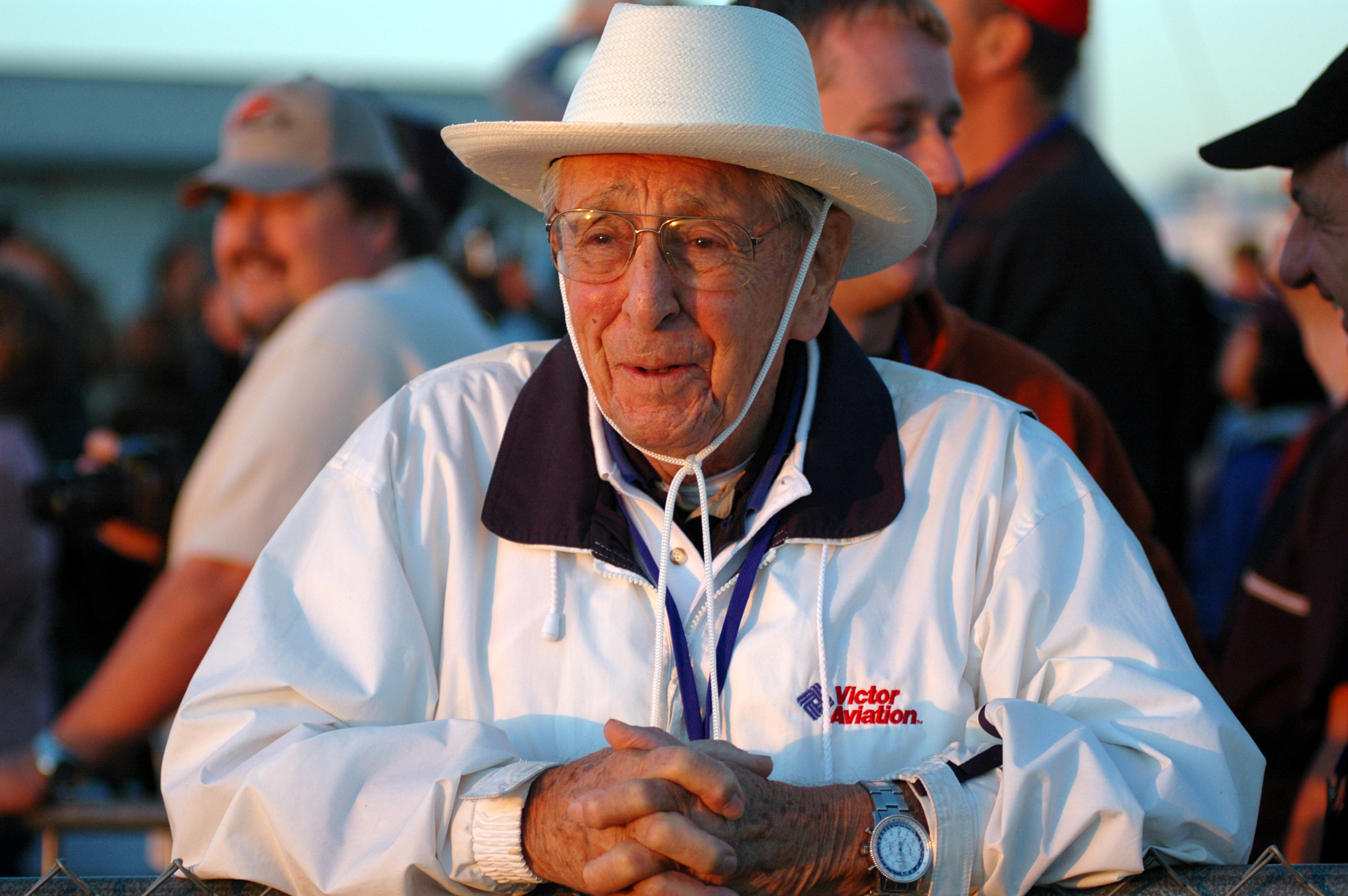
Crossfield at the launch of Space Ship One in October 2004

Crossfield was played by Scott Wilson in the 1983 film The Right Stuff.

Crossfield co-authored Always Another Dawn, a story of a rocket test pilot, with Clay Blair Jr, and authored "Onward and Upward" Research Airplanes, Act II.

In 1986 he created and funded the A. Scott Crossfield Aerospace Education Teacher of the Year Award presented annually under the stewardship of the Civil Air Patrol during the National Congress on Aerospace Education later called the National Conference on Aerospace Education (NCASE). After his death in 2006 and the shift of NCASE from an annual to biannual conference, Crossfields's daughter, Sally Crossfield Farley, moved the award to the National Aviation Hall of Fame where it is presented during the Enshrinement Weekend each July in Dayton, Ohio.

In the 1991 Discovery Channel series Frontiers of Flight, Crossfield judged he "...probably had more centrifuge time, pressure suit time and pressure chamber time and all of that than any man alive."

From 2001 to 2003, Crossfield trained pilots Terry Queijo, Kevin Kochersberger, Chris Johnson and Ken Hyde for The Wright Experience, preparing to fly a reproduction Wright Flyer on the 100th anniversary of the Wright Brothers' first flight on December 17, 1903. The training was successful, but the December 17, 2003 re-creation failed due to low engine power and the flyer's rain-soaked fabric covering which added considerably to its takeoff weight. The Wright replica ultimately flew successfully at Kill Devil Hills, North Carolina after the Centennial jubilee but without media coverage.

When asked to name his favorite airplane, Crossfield replied, "the one I was flying at the time," because he thoroughly enjoyed them all and their unique personalities.

== Death ==
2006 Cessna 210A crash
Accident
- Date: Wednesday, April 19, 2006; 11:10 AM EST
- Summary: ATC error Foul weather Pilot error
- Site: Ludville, Georgia, U.S.

Aircraft
- Aircraft type: Cessna 210A
- Aircraft name: Centurion
- Registration: N6579X C/n; msn:21057579
- Flight origin: Prattville-Grouby Field; Prattville, Alabama, U.S.
- Last stopover: Maxwell Air Force Base; Montgomery, Alabama
- Destination: Manassas Regional Airport; Manassas, Virginia
- Passengers: 0
- Crew: 1
- Fatalities: 1 (all)

On April 19, 2006, a Cessna 210A piloted by Crossfield was reported missing while flying from Prattville, Alabama toward Manassas, Virginia, near his home in Herndon. On April 20, authorities confirmed his body was found in the wreckage of his plane in a remote area of Ludville in Pickens County Georgia. There were severe thunderstorms in the area when air traffic controllers lost radio and radar contact with Crossfield's plane.

The Gordon County Sheriff's department reported that debris from Crossfield's aircraft was found in three different locations within a quarter mile, suggesting that the plane broke up while it was still in the air.

Crossfield was returning from Maxwell Air Force Base, Montgomery, Alabama, where he had given a speech to a class of young Air Force officers attending the Air and Space Basic Course. His funeral ceremony was held at the Arlington National Cemetery on August 15, 2006.

On September 27, 2007, the National Transportation Safety Board issued a report stating the probable cause of his crash to be as follows: "The pilot's failure to obtain updated en route weather information, which resulted in his continued instrument flight into a widespread area of severe convective activity, and the air traffic controller's failure to provide adverse weather avoidance assistance, as required by Federal Aviation Administration directives, both of which led to the airplane's encounter with a severe thunderstorm and subsequent loss of control."

== Honors ==
Crossfield received the Lawrence Sperry Award (1954), Octave Chanute Award (1954), Iven C. Kincheloe Award (1960), American Rocket Society (ARS) Astronautics Award (1960), Harmon International Trophy (1961 at the White House by President John F. Kennedy), Collier Trophy (1961 at the White House by President Kennedy in 1962), John J. Montgomery Award (1962), NASA Distinguished Public Service Medal (1993), and was named Honorary Fellow by the American Institute of Aeronautics and Astronautics (AIAA) (1999). Crossfield is the only American to be honored in the White House for his contributions in advancing aeronautical science—or any other discipline—more than once, let alone two consecutive years. He has been inducted into the International Aerospace Hall of Fame (1965), National Aviation Hall of Fame (1983), the International Space Hall of Fame (1988), the Virginia Aviation Hall of Fame (1998), Aerospace Walk of Honor (1990), The Glen A. Gilbert Memorial Award (1990), the FAI Gold Air Medal (1994) and the National Air and Space Museum Trophy (2000). Posthumously, he has been awarded the Hoyt S. Vandenberg Award, the Paul Tissandier Diploma, the Victor A. Prather Award, and the Donald D. Engen Award.

An elementary school was named in his honor near his last residence, in Herndon, Virginia (a community just northeast of Dulles International Airport). A ribbon named after him is one of the Aerospace Education Awards in the Civil Air Patrol Senior Members program. The terminal at the Chehalis-Centralia Airport (CLS) in Washington state bears his name.

He received the A. Scott Crossfield Aerospace Education Teacher of the Year Award, which presented at the National Aviation Hall of Fame's Annual Enshrinement Ceremony Weekend in Dayton, Ohio.

Crossfield received an honorary doctor of science degree from the Florida Institute of Technology in 1982.

== Legacy ==
While he was celebrated as a daring test pilot, he claimed that his actual profession was an engineer. "I am an aeronautical engineer, an aerodynamicist and a designer. My flying was only primarily because I felt that it was essential to designing and building better airplanes for pilots to fly."

In the 23rd century of the Star Trek universe, Crossfield is honored with the Crossfield-class of starships, one of which, USS Discovery (NCC-1031), is the main setting of Star Trek: Discovery.
