= Courtney Smith (wide receiver) =

American gridiron football player (born 1987)

No. 6
- Position: Wide receiver

Personal information
- Born: March 6, 1987 (age 39); New Orleans, Louisiana, U.S.
- Listed height: 6 ft 5 in (1.96 m)
- Listed weight: 230 lb (104 kg)

Career information
- High school: Prattville (AL)
- College: South Alabama
- NFL draft: 2011: undrafted

Career history
- New York Jets (2011); Hamilton Tiger-Cats (2011); New Orleans VooDoo (2012–2014)

Career AFL statistics
- Receptions: 151
- Receiving yards: 1,498
- Tackles: 34
- Interceptions: 1
- Total TDs: 36
- Stats at ArenaFan.com
- Stats at Pro Football Reference

Courtney A. Smith (born March 6, 1987) is a former American football wide receiver. He was signed by the New York Jets of the National Football League after going undrafted in the 2011 NFL draft. He played college football at the University of South Alabama.

== Personal life ==
Smith, originally from New Orleans, was forced to leave his home during Hurricane Katrina. He was separated from his sister and parents for several weeks due to Katrina. After evacuating to Texas and attending high school there, his family moved to Prattville, Alabama. Smith was a big prospect coming out of Prattville High School and John F. Kennedy High School in New Orleans. Smith was recruited by Alabama, LSU, Florida State, Memphis, Troy, Tulane and Southern Methodist before he accepted a scholarship to play at UAB. Smith would end his college career at South Alabama.

Smith's uncle, Wayne Smith, stood out at Tulane in the early '80s.

== Collegiate career ==
Smith started his collegiate career at UAB, where he played in 11 of 12 contests while earning a start in the final game of the year. He posted six catches for 33 yards. Smith had two receptions for 14 yards, both season-high totals, for UAB against ninth-ranked Georgia in the third game of the year. Smith transferred to Southeastern Louisiana University and played in the Lions’ 2007 season opener, catching one pass for eight yards at New Mexico State. Smith later transferred to South Alabama, where he would stay for the remainder of his college career. He ended his career at USA with 59 catches for 1,282 yards and 10 touchdowns, leading his team in every category.

Smith is South Alabama's first player to be selected for the Under Armour Senior Bowl and is the first Jaguar to be signed to an NFL roster.

== Professional career ==
=== New York Jets ===
Smith accepted a contract with the New York Jets on July 26, 2011 for an undisclosed amount. Smith became the first player from the University of South Alabama to be on an NFL roster. He was waived on August 30.

=== Hamilton Tiger-Cats ===
Smith was signed by the Canadian Football League's Hamilton Tiger-Cats on September 29, 2011 and placed on their practice squad.

=== New Orleans VooDoo ===
The Arena Football League assigned Smith to the New Orleans VooDoo on April 11, 2012. He was placed on the team's inactive list.
