= Daniel Pratt Historic District =

Historic district in Alabama, United States

- U.S. National Register of Historic Places
- U.S. Historic district
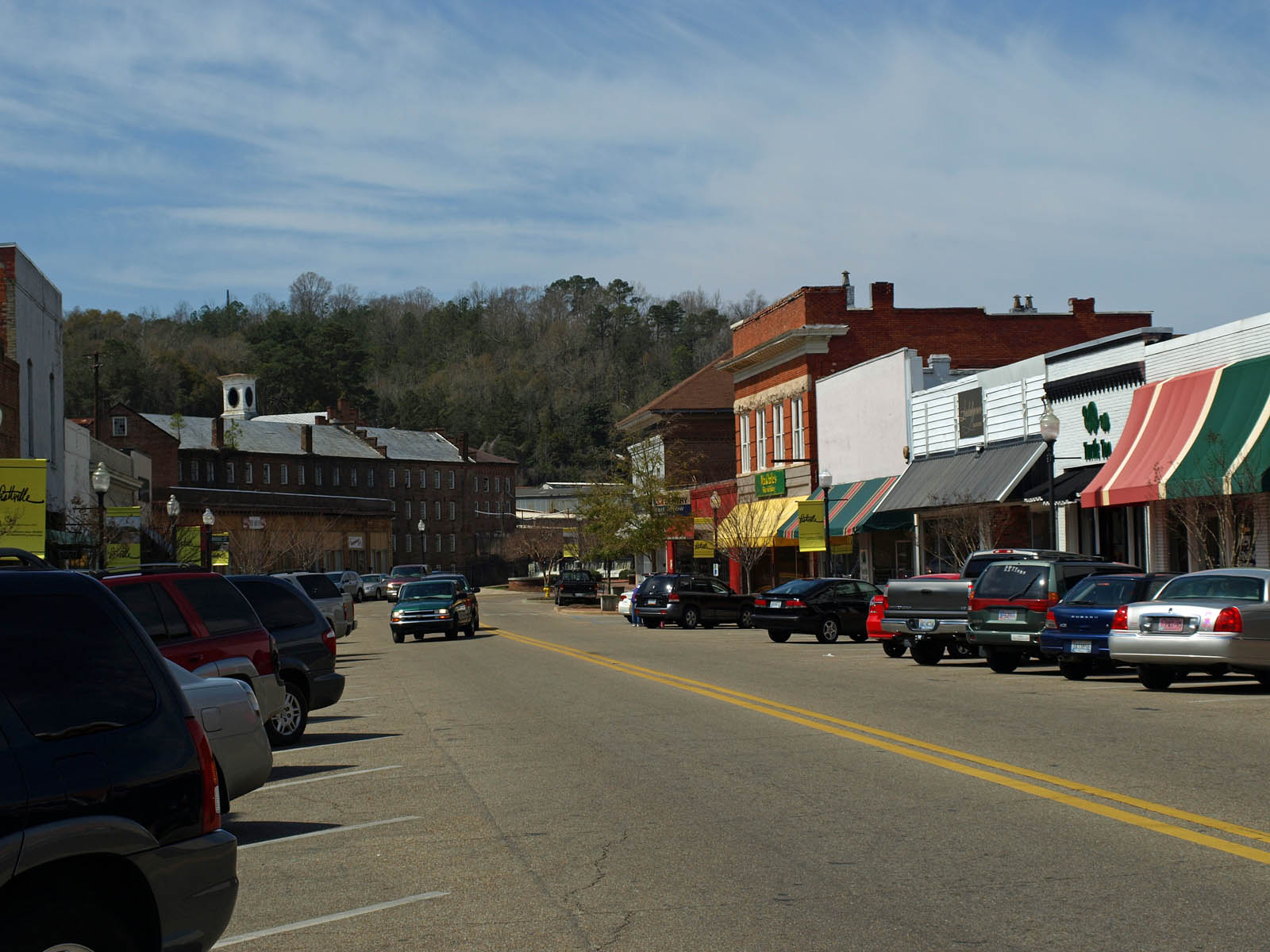
- West Main Street looking west, in the heart of the historic district

- Location within Alabama Location within the United States
- Interactive map showing the location of Daniel Pratt Historic District
- Location: Roughly bounded by Northington, 1st, 6th, Bridge, and Court Sts., Prattville, Alabama
- Coordinates: 32°27′41″N 86°28′20″W
- Area: 140 acres (57 ha)
- Architect: Multiple
- Architectural style: Greek Revival, Italianate, Bungalow
- NRHP reference No.: 84000596
- Added to NRHP: August 30, 1984

The Daniel Pratt Historic District is a historic district that includes 140 acres (57 ha) and 154 buildings in Prattville, Alabama, United States. It is named in honor of Prattville's founder, Daniel Pratt. The district includes the historic downtown and is roughly bounded by 6th Street in the north, Northington Street in the east, 1st Street in the south, and Bridge and Court streets in the west. Architecture in the district includes the Greek Revival, Italianate, and Bungalow styles. It was listed on the National Register of Historic Places on August 30, 1984.

The district includes the Autauga County Courthouse. It also includes the site of the Daniel Pratt House, which was demolished in 1960 to make way for the expansion of the successor to the Pratt industrial complex.

== List of properties ==
The district, which spans 15 blocks and once served as an industrial hub, encompasses over 200 properties that were primarily built in the timeframe of 1840 to 1930. The following structures are listed in no particular order.

- 215 and 225 South Court Street; built 1900.
- B.W. Moncrief General Merchandise (207-213 South Court Street); built from 1910-20.
- Service station (201 South Court Street); built c. 1920, contains Mission Revival architecture such as the elements of tiled parapet and zapatos.
- Old Autauga County Courthouse (147 South Court Street); built 1870 and an example of Italianate architecture applied to civil architecture.
- 190 Hunt's Alley; built 1875, originally servants' quarters for the Miles-Barnes-Ellis House.
- 143 Hunt's Alley; built c. 1895, possibly originally a millworker's house.
- 127, 131, 135, 139, and 141 Hunt's Alley; built c. 1900, row of five identical dwellings intended as rental space for slaves.
- Miles-Ellis-Barnes House (115 South Court Street); built c. 1850, originally owned by Benjamin Miles, superintendent of frame and brush department for the Pratt Cotton Gin Factory.
- Chambliss-Thomas Building (103 South Court Street); built 1924.
- Service station (101 South Court Street); built 1922.
- Autauga County Courthouse (134 North Court Street); built 1906, an example of Richardsonian Romanesque architecture. Designed by the Bruce Architectural Company of Birmingham and contracted by Lewman and Company of Louisville.
- Planter's Warehouse (138 North Court Street); built 1913.
- Millworker's cottage (131 North Court Street); built c. 1915 to serve Prattville Cotton Mills.
- Millworker's cottage (117 North Court Street); built c. 1880 to serve Prattville Cotton Mills. One of the few surviving 19th-century mill cottages.
- Mill house (143 North Court Street); built c. 1880, one of few surviving mill houses out of hundreds built for Prattville Cotton Mills.
- 131 and 141 First Avenue; built c. 1880, pair of mill houses which are among the few surviving houses of the village that served Prattville Cotton Mills.
- 334 Third Avenue; built c. 1900, part of the Prattville Cotton Mills mill village.
- Cook House (209 North Court Street); built c. 1925.
- Esco House (217 North Court Street); built c. 1900.
- Golden House (221 North Court Street); built c. 1900.
- McHearg Houses (231 and 233 North Court Street); built c. 1880 and c. 1925.
- Johnson House (245 North Court Street); built c. 1895.
- Evans House (253 North Court Street); built c. 1935.
- 174 Fifth Street; built c. 1890.
- Durden-Miller-Misseldine House (164 West Fifth Street); built c. 1885.
- Kelly House (152 West Fifth Street); built c. 1925.
- Ward-King House (120 West Fifth Street); built c. 1890.
- 223 and 227 Chestnut Street; built c. 1910, pair of dwellings.
- Meeks House (205 Chestnut Street); built c. 1880.
- Post House (201 Chestnut Street); built c. 1925.
- Planter's Cotton Warehouse (164 West Fifth Street); built c. 1880
- Garrett House (133 West Fifth House); built c. 1885.
- Jones House (121 West Fifth Street); built c. 1890.
- Ward Chapel African Methodist Episcopal Church (130 Fourth Street); built c. 1891, land originally purchased by the African Methodist Episcopal Church from Merrill Pratt, Daniel Pratt's nephew.
- David Hall House (106 Chestnut Street); built c. 1880. Was reputedly built for David Hall, now serves as a law office for W. Clarence Atkeison (as of 1984).
- Lowery House (117 North Chestnut Street); built c. 1890.
- Hunt-Rawlinson House (141 North Chestnut Street); built c. 1900.
- 216 North Chestnut Street; built 1890.
- 214 North Chestnut Street; built 1880.
- Chambliss House (101 East Fifth Street); built c. 1920.
- George House (109 East Fifth Street); built c. 1925.
- Cook House (115 East Fifth Street); built c. 1880.
- Weir-Garner House (147 East Fifth Street); built c. 1860.
- Hunt-Sullivan House (153 East Fifth Street); built c. 1880.
- Hunt-Stoudemire House (171 East Fifth Street); built c. 1880.
- Lindsey House (209 North Washington Street); built c. 1900.
- Wyatt House (110 East Fifth Street); built c. 1930.
- Wadsworth-Roach House (113 East Fifth Street); built c. 1930.
- Nixon-Jackson House (120 East Fifth Street); built c. 1930.
- Kilgore House (138 East Fifth Street); built c. 1930.
- Smith-Bayard House (137 North Washington Street); built c. 1890.
- Hannon House (113 North Washington Street); built c. 1890.
- Wilkinson-Avant House (105 North Washington Street); built c. 1895.
- 157 East Fourth Street; built c. 1939, considered an exception to the “50-year” criteria for its example of 1920s-40s American colonial architecture.
- Henry Bell House (145 East Fourth Street); built 1935, noted for its reinterpretation of federal architecture.
- Golson House (133 East Fourth Street); built c. 1885.
- Northington-Ross House (117 East Fourth Street); built c. 1895.
- First United Methodist Church (100 East Fourth Street; built 1912, example of neo-Tudor architecture.
- St. Mark's Episcopal Church (178 East Fourth Street); built 1909, example of Gothic Revival architecture.
- Gipson House (129 East Third Street); built 1888, owned by the Prattsville First Baptist Church as of 1984.
- Norton-Anderson House (239 South Chestnut Street); built c. 1925, originally built for Harry W. Norton upon his marriage to Nora Ellen Mims, who was daughter of Wilbur Fisk Mims and granddaughter of county historian Shadrack Mims.
- Buckner House (120 South Chestnut Street); built c. 1890.
- Ticknor-Hazen House (206 South Chestnut Street); built c. 1850. Constructed by Daniel Pratt for his niece, Mary Ticknor, who married Pratt Gin Factory worker and eventual Prattville Presbyterian Church pastor from July 1861 to July 1877 James K. Hazen. Later occupied by town mayor James Burns.
- Cobb-Westbrook House (152 East Third Street); built c. 1930.
- Johnson-Pirtle House (170 East Third Street); built 1936.
- Bateman House (218 South Washington Street); built 1921.
- Griffin-Wilkinson House (266 South Washington House); built c. 1930 by Carl Griffin.
- Stewart-Murphree-Smith House (139 East Main Street); built c. 1900
- Bateman House (141 East Main Street); built c. 1900 by James M. Bateman.
- NW corner Northington (199 East Sixth Street); built 1850, 1895.
- 159 North Northington Street; built 1913, originally occupied by the Collier family.
- 132 North Northington Street; built c. 1900 by W.W. Dunkin.
- 217 Wetumpka Street; built c. 1900 and occupied by the Rice, Archibald, Gresham, Bateman, Searcy and Cranfield families.
- 225 Wetumpka Street; built c. 1910 for William T. Northington.
- 235 Wetumpka Street; built c. 1905 as a Baptist pastorium.
- 245 Wetumpka Street; built 1906 for Dr. D.P. Jones Sr.
- 301 Wetumpka Street; built c. 1855, 1895 for Mecklenburg County, North Carolina native William H. Northington as his (reported) second house on Wetumpka Street.
- 306 Wetumpka Street; built c. 1855, 1880 for Pratt foundry foreman (supervisor) M.D. Fisher.
- Dismukes House (129 North Northington Street); built c. 1930.
- 260 Wetumpka Street; built 1935 and used as a Methodist parsonage from its construction until 1981.
- 246 Wetumpka Street; built c. 1880 and used as a parsonage for the Prattsville First Methodist Church until 1935.
- 216 Wetumpka Street; built c. 1895 as a parsonage for the presiding elder (district superintendent) alongside 246 Wetumpka Street.
- Prattville Primary School (210 Wetumpka Street); built 1927 and potentially designed by Frank Lockwood, north of the site of where Prattville Academy once stood.
  - Prattville Academy site (opposite Fourth Street intersection); built 1859 by Daniel Pratt as Prattville Male and Female Academy. Nearby marker commemorated in 1916 by the United Daughters of the Confederacy commemorates American Civil War unit “Prattville Dragoons”. Building was demolished in 1929, is now a part of Prattville Primary School as of 1984.
- 123 South Washington Street; built c. 1915, specimen of early Prattville worker housing.
- Cook House (127 South Washington Street); built c. 1870.
- Wynn House (213 South Washington Street); built c. 1930.
- Parrish-Frye House (222 South Washington Street); built c. 1895.
- Walker House (319 South Washington Street); built 1921.
- A.F. Fay-Grouby House (345 South Washington Street); built c. 1880.
- Fay Servant House (345 South Washington Street); built c. 1880.
- Fay-Mercer House (403 South Washington Street); built 1854 by George W. Coe.
- Autauga Baptist Association Office (326 South Washington Street); built c. 1930.
- Spigener House (346 South Washington Street); built c. pre-1836, potentially built by Joseph May and possibly the oldest structure in Prattsville.
- 163 First Street; built c. 1930.
- 149 First Street; built c. 1850.
- 137 First Street; built c. 1890, served as a workers’ cottage.
- 131 First Street, built c. 1890, server as a workers’ cottage.
- 135 First Street (behind 131 First Street); built c. 1840, built as part of the Mims Hotel complex and once served as the bedroom of Annie Mims.
- Anthony-Booth-Wilkinson House (123 First Street); built c. 1883 by William Anthony.
- Mims Hotel (121 First Street); built c. 1840, formerly the center of the hotel complex before moving to its site in 1982.
- Wright House (317 South Chestnut Street); built c. 1925.
- McWilliams-Smith House (102 East Main Street); built c. 1850 reputedly for A.K. McWilliams, and was later owned by Amos Smith and his son, George, who founded Pratt's sash and blind factory in 1850.
- Scott House (342 South Chestnut Street); built c. 1890.
- Tumlin House (340 South Chestnut Street); built c. 1875, reputedly as a servant house.
- Suzuki World (113 West Main Street); built c. 1940, an example of Moderne architecture built for Dave R. Yarbrough and Terry Walls as a Plymouth dealership, and was serving as a Suzuki dealership as of 1984.
- 131 West Main Street; built c. 1900 for C.E. Thomas and formerly housed Behrendson Bakery.
- 133-135 West Main Street; built 1915 as storefronts for C.E. Thomas.
- 137-141 West Main Street; built c. 1895 as a pair of storefronts.
- Rawlinson-Gay Building (147-149 West Main Street); built 1899, built for E.J. Rawlinson at Rawlinson's Mercantile.
- 151-153 West Main Street; built c. 1900 as a commercial structure for Howard S. Doster.
- 155 West Main Street; built 1912 as a mercantile establishment for W.G. Robertson.
- 159 West Main Street; built 1905 as a storefront for Howard S. Doster, partially occupied by Progress Printing as of 1984.
- 161 West Main Street; built 1903, formerly Behrendson Bakery.
- 163-165 West Main Street; built 1920 as storefronts for J.B. Bell.
- Hagler-Faulk Office (132-134 West Main Street); built 1900 as a housing store and a medical office for Dr. J.W. Hagler.
- Spigner-Grouby Building (138-142 West Main Street); built c. 1895, 1910. Originally served as a Spigner furniture store, then as a storefront for Chattagnnoa Roofing and Foundry Co.
- Hurd-Grouby-Odell Building (144 West Main Street); built 1912 by W.G. Hurd.
- Ellis-Newton Building (146 West Main Street); built 1900 as a commercial structure by merchants D.N. Smith Sr. and J. Norton Rice.
- 150-152 West Main Street; built 1900 as a storefront and office by S.D. McLemore.
- Wilkinson-Musgrove Building (154 West Main Street); built 1900 as part of a range of businesses for Prattville Rexall Drugs, for Dr. J.E. Wilkinson. Later used as the Prattville Post Office.
- Prattville Rexall Drugs (160 West Main Street); built 1904, c. 1928 for First National Bank (west half) and Prattville Drug Co. (east half; built 1907). The east building burnt down in 1928, was rebuilt, and in 1957 the west side was purchased and made into Prattville Rexall Drugs.
- Downtown Grocery/Godwin Hardware (164-166 West Main Street); built c. 1900 as a two-unit structure for J.T. Floyd.
- Red Arrow Hardware (172 West Main Street); built c. 1860 by Daniel Pratt as a cotton warehouse for Pratt Manufacturing Company.
- 176 West Main Street (formerly Prattville Mercantile Co.); built c. 1855 by Daniel Pratt for mill operatives. Considered one of the most significant Antebellum commercial structures in Central Alabama.
- Bell-Thomas Building (173-187 West Main Street); built 1921 as an eight-unit commercial building by J.B. Bell and C.E. Thomas.
- Wainwright-Smith-Cook House (115 Maple Street); built c. 1860 for Pratt factory complex mechanic James Wainwright. It is the only unaltered residence surviving from mid-19th century residential areas immediately surrounding original factory buildings on the south side of Autauga Creek.
- Barnes-Cavnar House (124 Maple Street); built 1898 for W.H. Barnes Sr.
- Bush Hog-Continental Gin Complex (West side of Autauga Creek)
  - Sash, Door, and Blind Factory; built c. 1849, oldest surviving structure of the complex. In 1857, the structure additionally housed a grist mill, machine shop, and a carriage & wagon factory.
  - Daniel Pratt Cotton Gin Factory; built 1854–55, remnants remain of a sign that once read “DANIEL PRATT COTTON MANUFACTURY”.
  - Daniel Pratt Gin Company (later addition); built 1896, represents the last major phase of expansion before Pratt companies merged with Continental Gin Company in 1899.
  - Continental Gin Company Warehouse; built 1911 on the site where Daniel Pratt once built a church/storefront in 1853.
  - Sheet Metal Department; built c. 1905, located south of the Continental Gin Warehouse.
  - Site of Daniel Pratt Foundry; built c. 1860, demolished c. 1965.
  - Site of Offices, Turntable, and Open Lumber Shed; built c. 1860, demolished c. 1965.
  - Site of Fountain; built c. 1855–57, demolished c. 1900.
- Gurney Industries, Inc. (originally Prattville Manufacturing Company); three structures all predating 1900, acquired by Gurney Industries in 1946.
  - Picker House (now offices for Gurney Industries); built as early as 1850–60, used as offices from 1946 onwards.
  - Prattville Manufacturing Company No. 1; built 1887–88, built to replace a textile mill built in 1859 that was damaged in a freshet on March 30, 1886.
  - Prattville Manufacturing Company No. 2; built 1896 as a near-mirror image of the first building.
- Autauga Creek Dam; built c. 1920, sold to Continental Gin Company after mills converted to electricity in 1932.
- Pratt Cemetery (on hill south of Bush Hog-Continental Complex); established c. 1840 by Daniel Pratt for his family, friends, and mill operatives. Notable graves include that of Pratt and his family, as well as painter George Cooke. Earliest marked grave is that of Pratt's baby daughter, Mary, who died September 21, 1843.

The district also contains multiple conditional contributing properties.
