= Second Nature (2003 film) =

2003 television film by Ben Bolt

Second Nature is a 2003 American made-for-television drama mystery science fiction film directed by Ben Bolt starring Alec Baldwin, Powers Boothe and Louise Lombard. It was written by E. Max Frye and released on 4 October 2003 in the United Kingdom.

== Cast ==
- Alec Baldwin as Paul Kane
- Powers Boothe as Kelton Reed
- Louise Lombard as Dr. Harriet Fellows
- Philip Jackson as Lawrence Augenblick
- Kurtis O'Brien as Young Bobby
- Leigh Zimmerman as Dr. Shepherd
- Michele Austin as Nurse
- Pip Torrens as Frank
- Courtney Rowan as Emily Kane
- Cornelia Winter as Amanda Kane
- Daisy Donovan as Kristina Kane / Amy O'Brien
- Charlie Lucas as Paperboy
- Clive Mantle as Maynard
- David Forrester as Hanna
- Garrick Hagon as Man in Screening Room

== Plot ==
Paul Kane is suffering from short-term memory loss after his plane crashes. Kelton Reed and Dr. Harriet Fellows help Kane to remember his earlier life.
