= Nick Perry (safety) =

American football player and coach (born 1991)

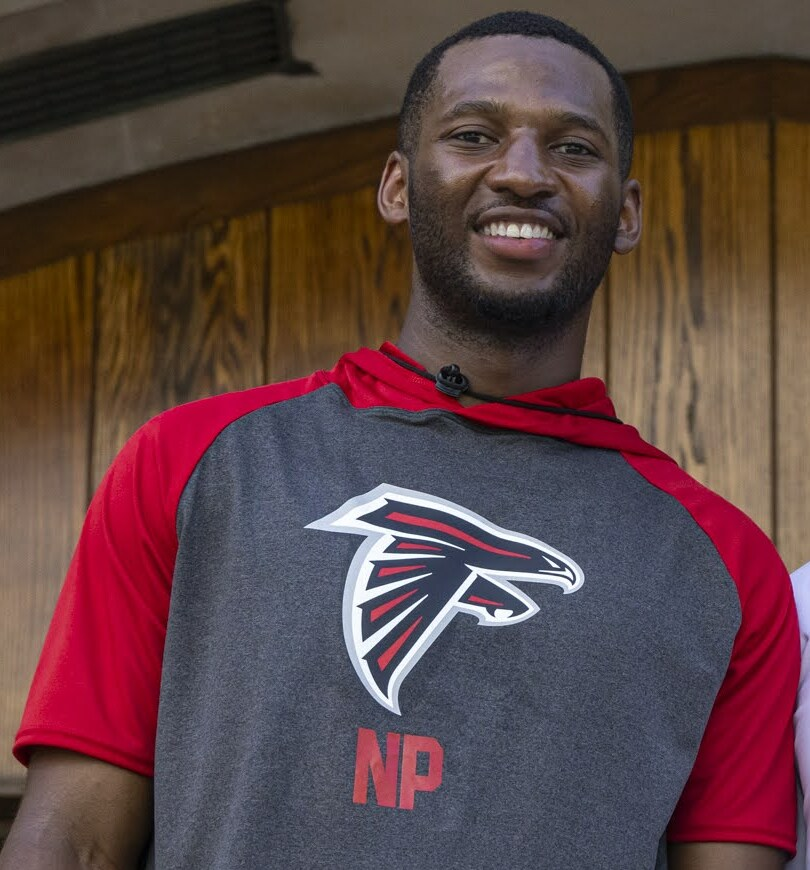
- Perry with the Atlanta Falcons in 2022

Virginia Tech Hokies
- Title: Cornerbacks coach

Personal information
- Born: December 7, 1991 (age 34); Prattville, Alabama, U.S.
- Listed height: 6 ft 1 in (1.85 m)
- Listed weight: 212 lb (96 kg)

Career information
- High school: Prattville (Prattville, Alabama)
- College: Alabama (2010–2014)
- NFL draft: 2015: undrafted

Career history

Playing
- Baltimore Ravens (2015)*; Philadelphia Eagles (2016)*
- * Offseason or practice squad member only

Coaching
- Alabama (2017–2018) Graduate assistant; Alabama (2019–2020) Defensive analyst; Atlanta Falcons (2021–2022) Assistant defensive backs coach; Atlanta Falcons (2023) Assistant wide receivers coach; Seattle Seahawks (2024) Defensive assistant; Arkansas (2025) Defensive backs coach; Virginia Tech (2026–present) Cornerbacks coach

Awards and highlights
- 2× BCS national champion (2011, 2012); 2× CFP national champion (2017, 2020)

Nick Perry (born December 7, 1991) is an American former professional football safety and current defensive backs coach for the Virginia Tech Hokies.

== Playing career ==
Perry played safety for five seasons at the University of Alabama coming out of Prattville High School under Nick Saban. There he won consecutive BCS National Championships in 2011 and 2012.

Pre-draft measurables
Height	Weight	Arm length	Hand span	Wingspan	40-yard dash	10-yard split	20-yard split	Vertical jump	Broad jump	Bench press
6 ft 0 1/2 in (1.84 m)	205 lb (93 kg)	30 7/8 in (0.78 m)	8 7/8 in (0.23 m)	6 ft 2 3/4 in (1.90 m)	4.67 s	1.57 s	2.68 s	32.5 in (0.83 m)	9 ft 8 in (2.95 m)	7 reps
All values from Pro Day

He was not selected during the 2015 NFL draft, so Perry signed as an undrafted free agent with the Ravens and was on their practice squad during 2015. In 2016 he was a member of the Philadelphia Eagles, but was released after training camp.

== Coaching career ==
=== Alabama ===
Perry began his coaching career at his alma mater in Alabama in 2017 as a graduate assistant. He remained a graduate assistant until the end of the 2017 when he was given the title of analyst for the 2019 season.

=== Atlanta Falcons ===
In 2021, Perry made the jump to the NFL as an assistant defensive backs coach for the Atlanta Falcons. In 2023, he switched roles and became the team's assistant wide receivers coach.

=== Arkansas ===
On January 10, 2025, Perry joined the Arkansas Razorbacks as the team's defensive backs coach.

=== Virginia Tech ===
On January 23, 2026, Perry joined the Virginia Tech Hokies as the team's defensive backs coach.
