= Montgomery–Janes–Whittaker House =

Historic house in Alabama, United States

- U.S. National Register of Historic Places
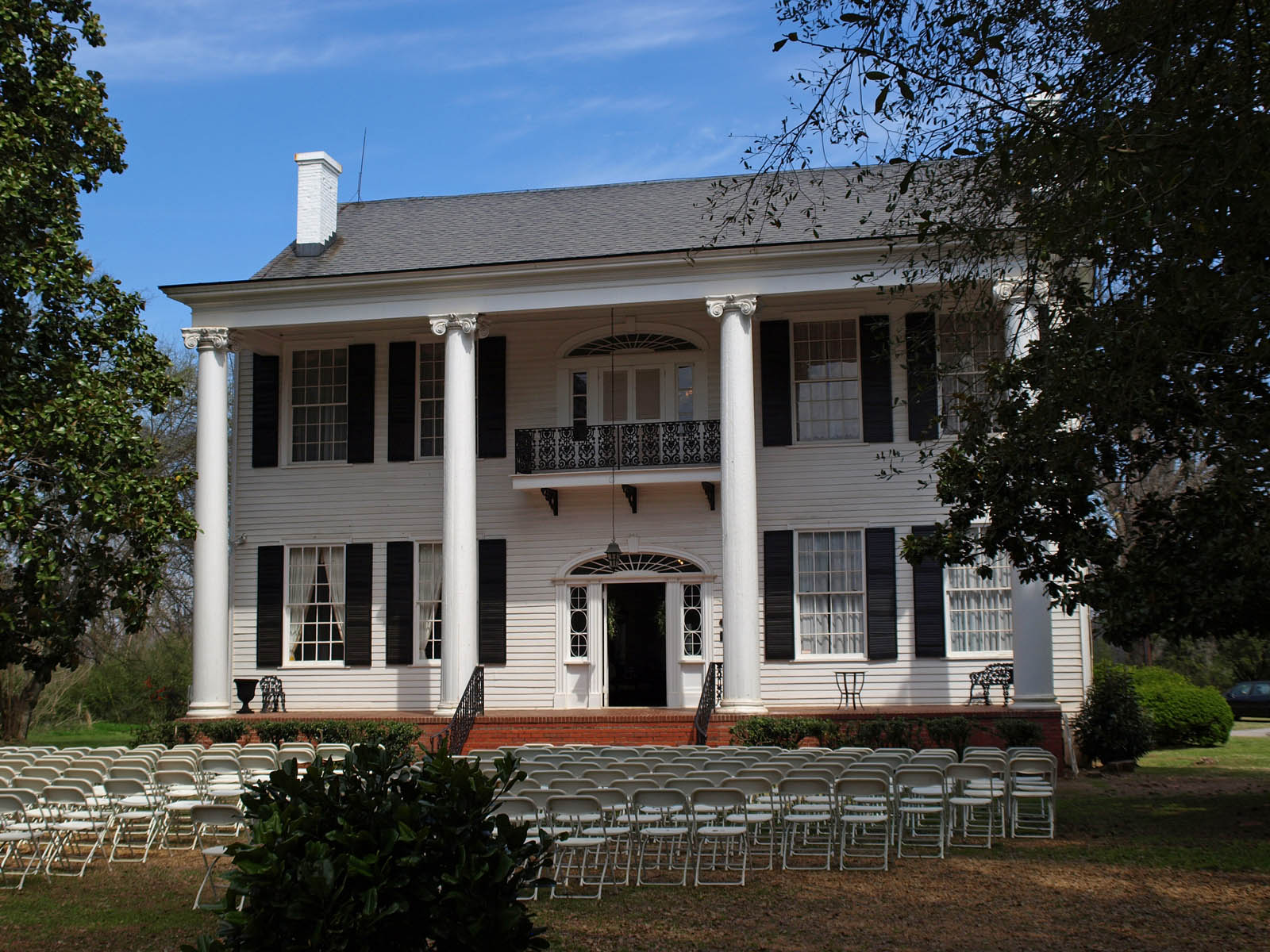
- The house in 2010

- Location within Alabama Location within the United States
- Nearest city: Prattville, Alabama
- Coordinates: 32°25′28″N 86°27′7″W
- Area: 4 acres (1.6 ha)
- Built: 1822–1844
- Architect: Montgomery, William
- Architectural style: Federal
- NRHP reference No.: 74000396
- Added to NRHP: October 25, 1974

The Montgomery–Janes–Whittaker House, best known today as Buena Vista, is a historic Federal style plantation house in Autauga County, Alabama, United States, south of Prattville. It was listed on the National Register of Historic Places on October 25, 1974. The house is currently owned by the Autauga County Heritage Association and operated as a historic house museum.

== History ==
Construction of the house was started in 1822 by one of the first landowners, John W. Freeman or Josiah Huie. It was completed by the next owner, William Montgomery, in 1844. Mary Emma Scott Stewart purchased the property in 1910 from the Montgomery family. Jacob Janes then owned the house for two years before it was sold to the Fred Whittaker family in 1937. The Whittaker family restored and added modern amenities to the house. They owned it until 1978, when the house was inherited by M.W. Petrey, Jr. It was sold again in 1982 to the Union Camp Corporation, a pulp and paper company that allowed the Autauga County Heritage Association to preserve and maintain the house. Following Union Camp's acquisition by International Paper, the new owner donated the house to the association in 2007.

== Architecture ==
Original exterior details of the 2 1/2-story frame house include delicately built fanlights over the front doors and in the side gable ends. The interior features elaborate plasterwork and a spiral mahogany staircase that ascends from the ground floor to the third floor attic. A monumental Ionic portico was added to the front facade of the house during the Colonial Revival period by the Stewart family. The Whittaker family changed the front portico floor from wood to brick and added cast iron to the existing second floor balcony during their restoration efforts.

== See also ==
- National Register of Historic Places listings in Autauga County, Alabama
