= George Cooke (painter) =

American painter (1793–1849)

- Born: George Esten Cooke; 1793; St. Mary's County, Maryland, U.S.
- Died: 1849 (aged 55–56); New Orleans, Orleans Parish, Louisiana, U.S.
- Known for: Primarily portrait painting
- Patrons: Daniel Pratt

George Esten Cooke (1793–1849) was an itinerant American painter who specialized in portrait and landscape paintings and was one of the South's best known painters of the mid nineteenth century. His primary patron was the industrialist Daniel Pratt, who built a gallery in Prattville, Alabama, solely to house Cooke's paintings.

== Early life ==
Cooke was born in St. Mary's County, Maryland, and abandoned a fledgling career in business at an early age in order to become a full-time artist.

== Career ==
After several years of painting portraits for a living, Cooke left for what would become a five-year tour of Europe. His time there was mostly spent learning from and copying the works of the Renaissance master artists, with many of Cooke's copies being sent back to the United States for show or sale.

At some time between 1826 and 1830, Cooke made a copy in Paris of The Raft of the Medusa, a monumental painting by Théodore Géricault depicting a notorious incident following a shipwreck. Cooke's smaller version (4' x 6') was shown in Boston, Philadelphia, New York City, and Washington, D.C., to crowds, who knew about the controversy surrounding subject. Reviews of the painting were favorable, and stimulated plays, poems, performances, and a children's book. The painting was bought by a former admiral, Uriah Phillips, who left it in 1862 to the New York Historical Society, where it was miscataloged as by Gilbert Stuart and remained inaccessible until the mistake was uncovered in 2006 following an inquiry by Nina Athanassoglou-Kallmyer, a professor of art history at the University of Delaware in Newark, Delaware. The university's conservation department undertook restoration of the work.

After returning to the U.S., Cooke and his wife spent the next decade traveling and working with no fixed home. His work took him throughout the Southern United States, where he primarily made his living painting portraits of both famous and ordinary people. By the 1840s, his portraits were earning him financial success and regional fame.

== Daniel Pratt's patronage ==
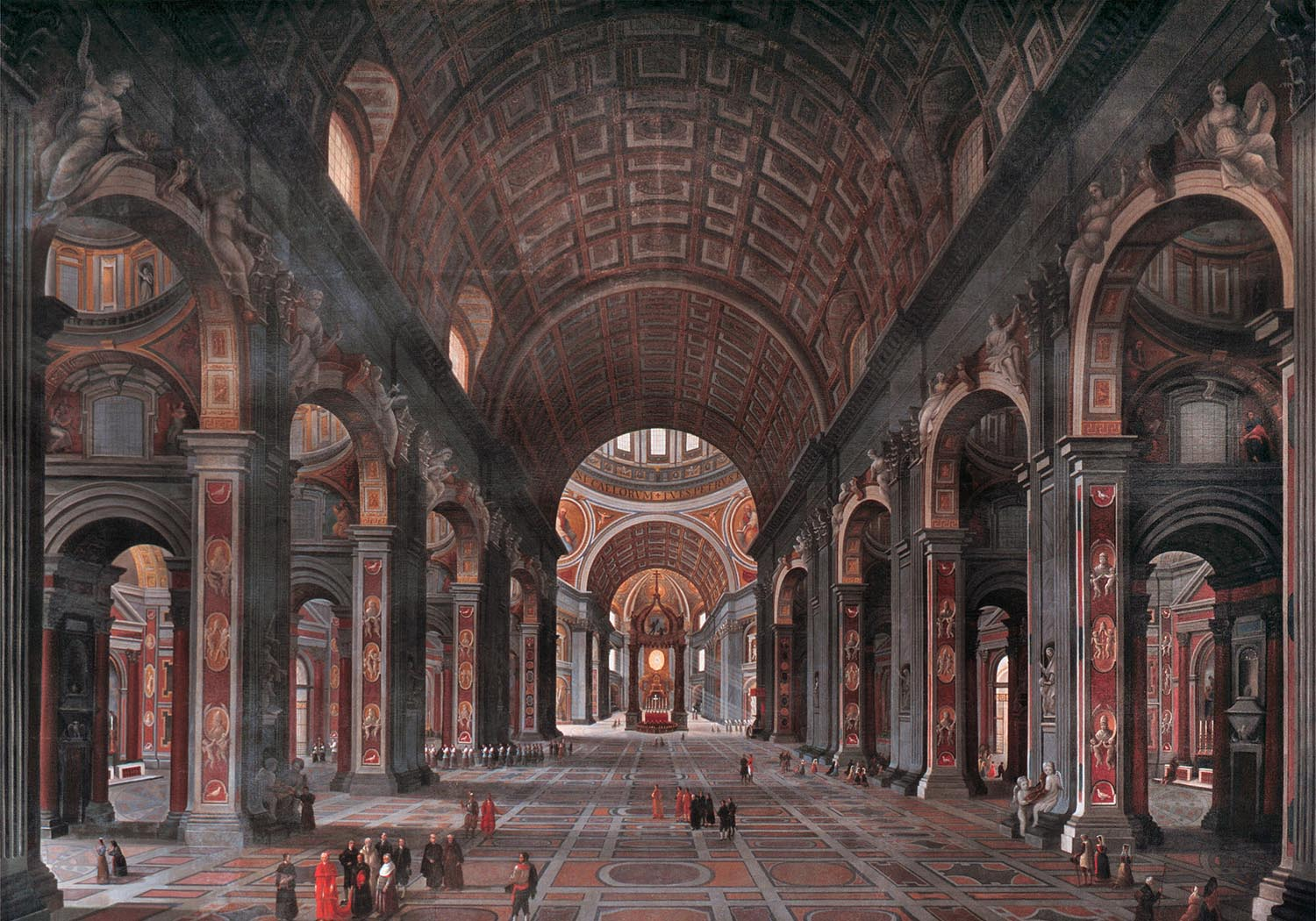
Interior of St. Peter's Rome, Cooke's largest and best known painting

In 1844 in New Orleans, Cooke started what would become his most important professional relationship when he met Daniel Pratt, an Alabama industrialist. Pratt was immediately drawn to Cooke's work, and decided to give the artist two floors in one of his warehouses for Cooke to use as a gallery and studio. After a few years, Pratt decided to take the unusual step of adding a separate gallery to his home in Prattville, Alabama, which was solely dedicated to the housing of Cooke's art. Pratt also commissioned Cooke to paint what would become his best known work, the Interior of St. Peter's Rome, a giant painting based on a smaller piece that Cooke had previously painted during his travels in Europe.

In 1867, Pratt's widow donated Interior of St. Peter's Rome to the University of Georgia in Athens, Georgia, where it still hangs today in the university's chapel. At 17 by 23.5 feet, the work was considered the largest framed oil painting in the world at the time of its 1867 donation, and it still ranks among the world's largest.

== Death and dispersal of his work ==
Cooke's health had never been very good; in 1849, in New Orleans, Orleans Parish, Louisiana, he contracted cholera and died quickly from the illness.

Nearly 20 years after his death, the gallery in Prattville, Alabama, was found to be infested with dry rot and had to be torn down to prevent the rot from spreading. As a result, all of Cooke's work housed at the gallery wound up being destroyed or dispersed. This prompted Pratt's widow to donate Interior of St. Peter's Rome to the University of Georgia.
