= High Point Town Center =

- Location: Prattville, Alabama, United States
- Coordinates: 32°27′45.76″N 86°23′30.74″W
- Address: Intersection of I-65 and Cobbs Ford Road
- Opened: 2008
- Num. of anchor tenants: 5

High Point Town Center is a lifestyle center located in Prattville, Alabama, United States, across from the Prattville Towne Center. The 900,000-square-foot (84,000 m^{2}) mall opened in 2008 but remained largely vacant leading to its sale at a bankruptcy auction in July 2011.

== Anchor tenants ==
- Belk
- JCPenney
- Publix
