= Prattville High School =

Public high school in Prattville, Alabama, United States

Location
- 1315 Upper Kingston Road; Prattville, Alabama 36067; United States; 32.50°N 86.47°W

Information
- Type: Public
- CEEB code: 012220
- Principal: Daniel Farris
- Teaching staff: 88.50 (FTE)
- Grades: 9–12
- Enrollment: 1,844 (2024-2025)
- Student to teacher ratio: 20.84
- Colors: Cardinal and white
- Athletics: 6 varsity sports
- Athletics conference: AHSAA, Class 7A Region 2
- Nickname: Lions
- Website: www.gophslions.com

Prattville High School, formerly Autauga County High School, is a high school in Prattville, Alabama, United States. It forms part of the Autauga County School. In 2010, it had an enrollment of 2,109 students and a faculty of 103 teachers in grades 9–12. In 2014, it had 2,057 students and 98 teachers. In 2018, there were 2,066 students, 101 teachers, and five administrators.The Autauga County Technology Center shares the same campus. The principal is Daniel E Farris.

== Autauga County Technology Center ==
The Autauga County Technology Center is a technical program that works in part with the surrounding schools in the county. The ACTC offers career clusters that can help improve a student's success in the workforce. It allows students to partake in a co-op program, allowing the students time during their school hours to go and shadow local affiliates. Some examples of the clusters offered are: Agriconstruction, Business Technology, Finance, Fire Science, Family and Consumer Science, STEM, Automotive Services, Educational Training, Welding, Health Sciences, and Cosmetology.

== Notable alumni ==
- Marlon Anderson, MLB player (class of '92)
- Kaitlan Collins, CNN White House correspondent (class of 2010)
- Evan Crawford, MLB player (class of '05)
- Bobby Greenwood, NFL player (class of '05)
- Roman Harper, NFL player (class of '01)
- Austin MacGinnis, American football player (class of 2013)
- Nick Perry, NFL player and coach (class of 2009)
- Kamryn Pettway, NFL player (class of 2014)
- Courtney Smith, NFL player (class of '06)
- Kevin Turner, NFL player (class of '87)
- Zac Woodfin, NFL player (class of '01)
