= Prattville–Grouby Field =

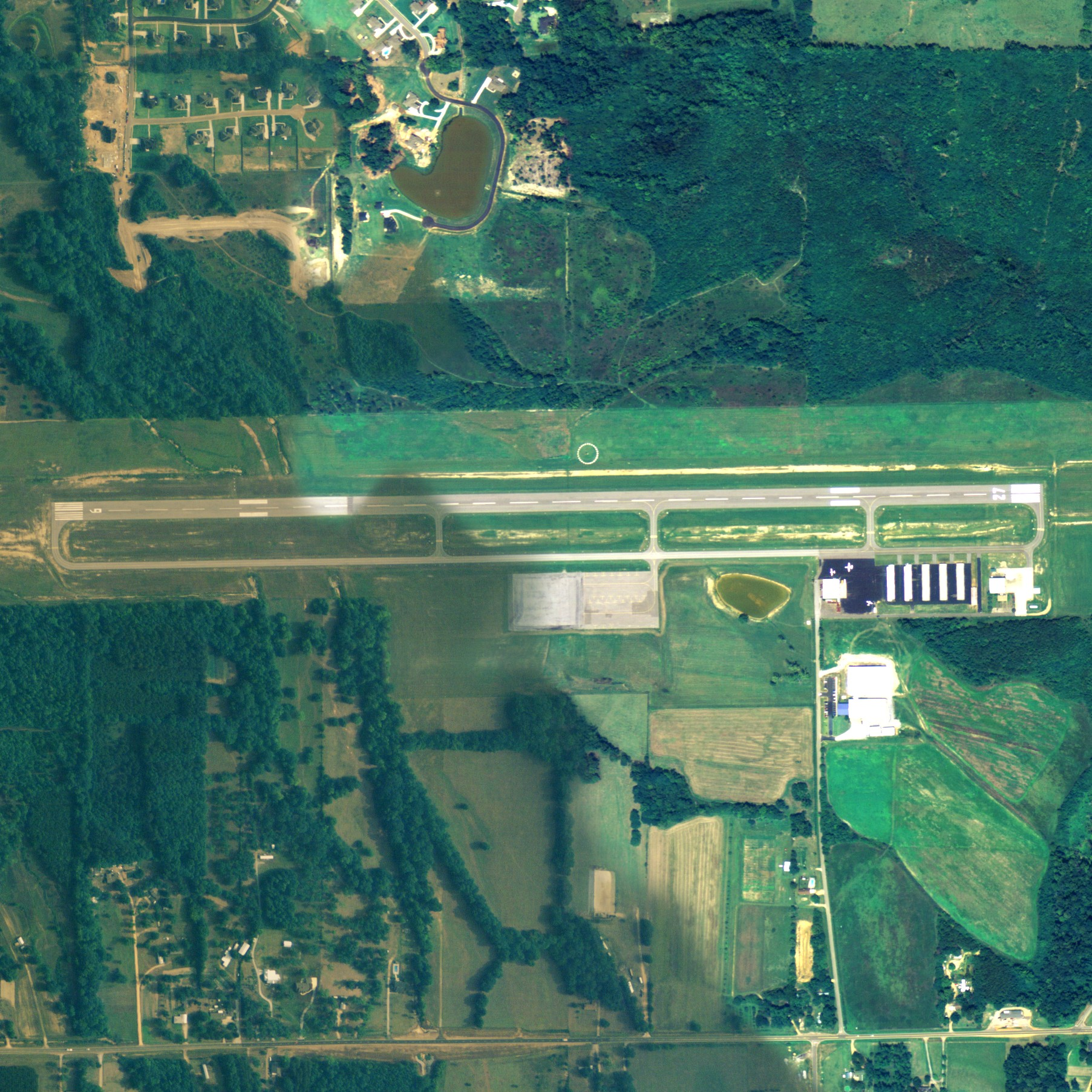
- NAIP aerial image, 2006
- IATA: none; ICAO: none; FAA LID: 1A9

Summary
- Airport type: Public
- Owner: Prattville Airport Authority
- Serves: Prattville, Alabama
- Elevation AMSL: 225 ft / 69 m
- Coordinates: 32°26′19″N 086°30′46″W
- Website: Prattville-Airport.com
- Interactive map of Prattville–Grouby Field

Runways
Direction	Length		Surface
Direction	ft	m	Surface
9/27	5,400	1,646	Asphalt

Statistics (2010)
- Aircraft operations: 8,754
- Based aircraft: 28
- Source: Federal Aviation Administration

Prattville–Grouby Field (FAA LID: 1A9) is a public-use airport located three nautical miles (3.5 mi; 5.6 km) southwest of the central business district of Prattville, a city in Autauga County, Alabama, United States. It is owned by the Prattville Airport Authority. It is also known as Prattville Airport or Autauga County Airport.

This airport is included in the FAA's National Plan of Integrated Airport Systems for 2011–2015, which categorized it as a general aviation facility.

== Facilities and aircraft ==
Prattville–Grouby Field covers an area of 82 acres (33 ha) at an elevation of 225 feet (69 m) above mean sea level. It has one runway designated 9/27 with an asphalt surface measuring 5,400 by 100 feet (1,646 by 30 m).

For the 12-month period ending November 1, 2010, the airport had 8,754 aircraft operations, an average of 23 per day: 97% general aviation and 3% military. At that time there were 28 aircraft based at this airport: 86% single-engine and 14% multi-engine.

== See also ==
- List of airports in Alabama
