= Daniel Pratt (industrialist) =

American industrialist from Alabama

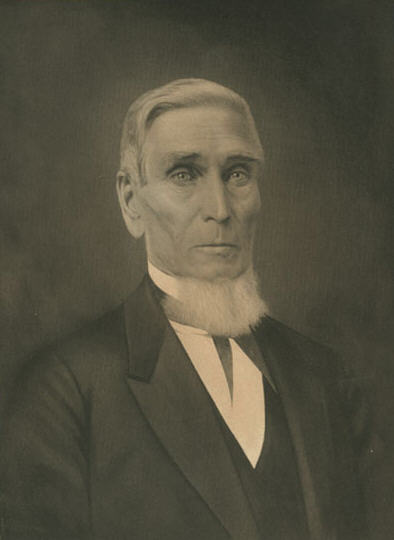
- Pratt depicted in a late 19th century illustration
- Born: July 20, 1799; Temple, New Hampshire, U.S.
- Died: May 13, 1873 (aged 73)
- Occupation: Industrialist

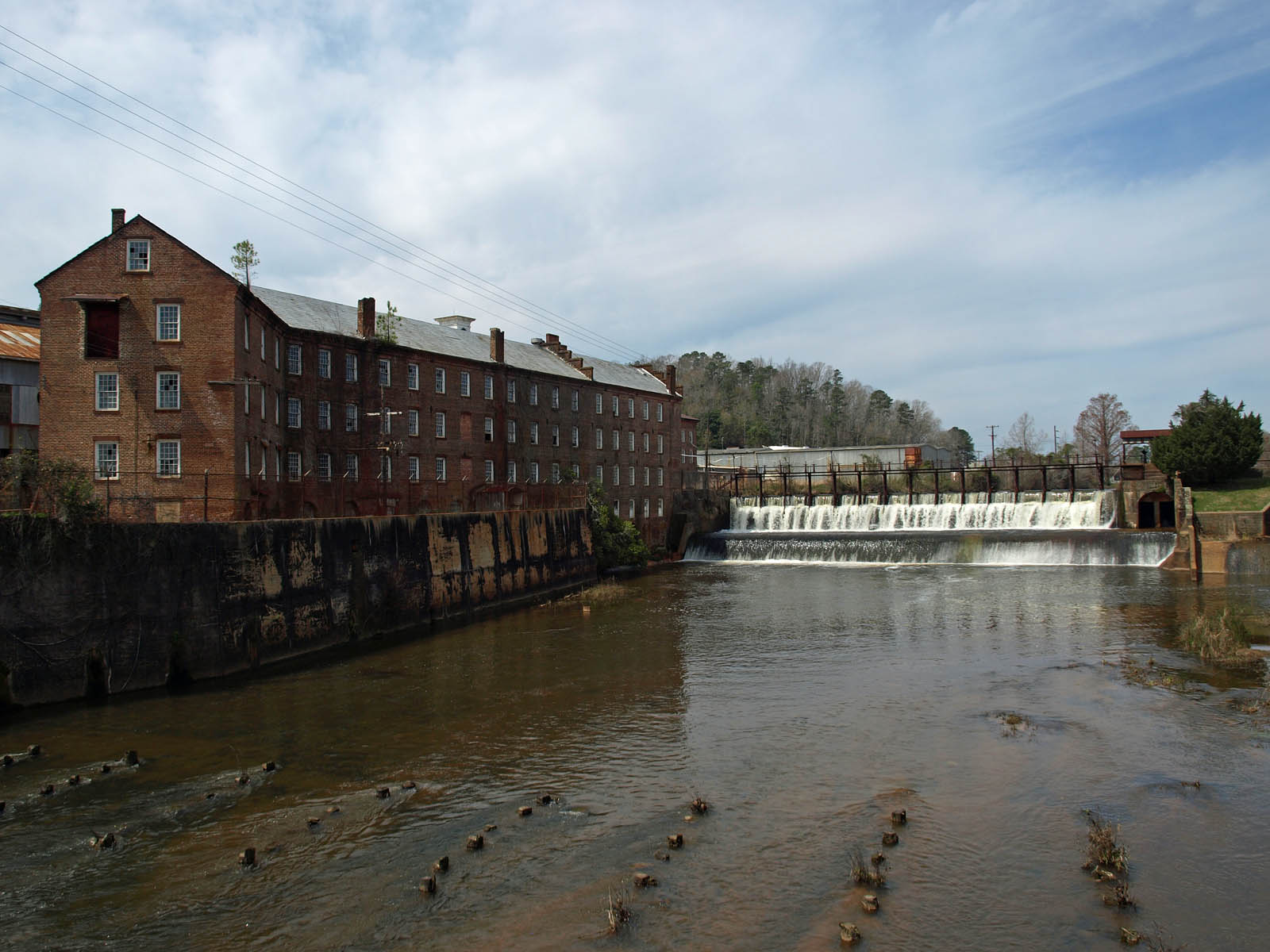
A March 2010 photo of the surviving factory buildings at the former Pratt Gin Company in Prattville, Alabama

Daniel Pratt (July 20, 1799 – May 13, 1873) was an American industrialist who pioneered ventures that opened the door for industry in Alabama. Prattville in Autauga County, Alabama, and Birmingham's Pratt City in Jefferson County, Alabama on the Pratt coal seam are both named for him. He is buried in Daniel Pratt Cemetery, located on top of Ginshop Hill near downtown Prattville, Alabama.

== Early life ==
Pratt was born in Temple, New Hampshire. He left New England in 1819 after earning a release from an architect apprenticeship that he started at age 16. He sailed for Savannah, Georgia and within two years moved to Milledgeville, Georgia.

== Career ==
By 1827, Pratt was a successful architect and builder recognized as a leader in his trade in the American South. While in Georgia, he met Samuel Griswold, another New Englander, who manufactured cotton gins. He had Pratt manage his factory and within a year Pratt was promoted to partner. Pratt urged Griswold to expand the business in Alabama. Griswold agreed to the venture at first, but later decided against it due to conflicts there between settlers and Native Americans.

Pratt decided to go it alone, and moved to central Alabama in 1833 with his wife, two slaves, and enough materials to construct 50 gins. He relocated to an area known as McNeil's Mill and leased land along a creek in Autauga County in 1836, where he began manufacturing cotton gins. He moved further up the creek, bought 1,822 acres (737 ha), and built a permanent cotton gin factory in 1838. He founded the new town of Prattville for the workers in his venture. This operation quickly became the largest producer of cotton gins in the world, and Alabama's first major industry.

As his business grew, he branched out with a sawmill, gristmill, window factory, iron foundry, woollen mill, railroad, bank, and the Oxmoor Blast Furnace in Birmingham. Pratt's businesses were badly affected by the American Civil War; many of his workers joined the military and his customer base shrank as the economy soured.

Much credit is given Pratt's efforts for easing Alabama's economic recovery during the Reconstruction period following the Civil War. His ability to call in debts on Northern accounts allowed him to rebuild his own operations, which helped make Autauga County exceptionally stable and prosperous in the period immediately after the Civil War. He was instrumental in opening and developing the Birmingham District as an iron-making center.

One of Pratt's slaves, Charles Atwood, purchased a house in the center of Prattville immediately after emancipation and became one of the founding investors in his former master's railroad ventures.
