= Charlie Lucas =

American sculptor

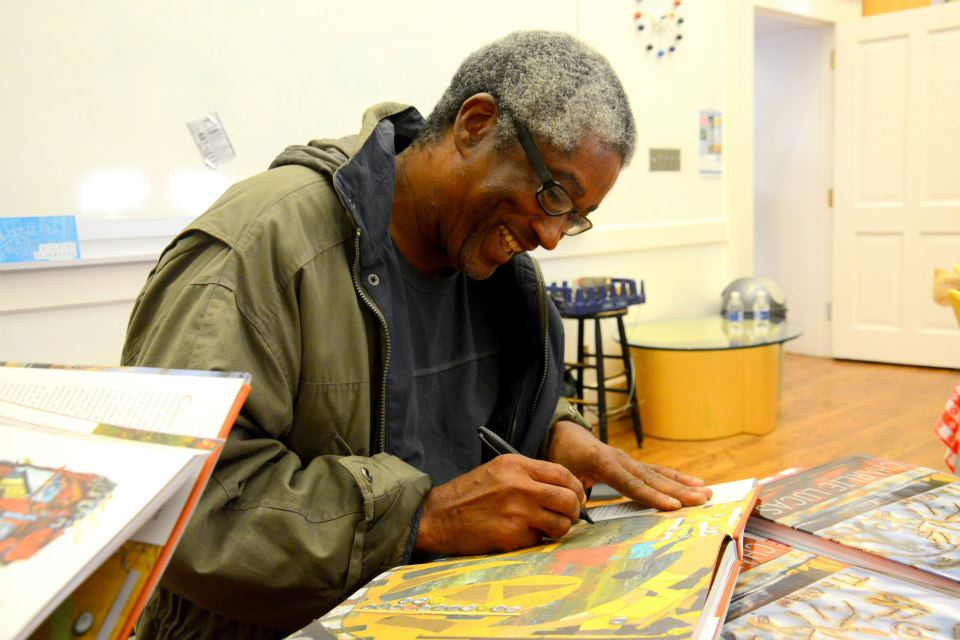
- Born: October 12, 1951 (age 74); Pink Lily, Alabama, U.S.
- Known for: Sculpture

Charlie Lucas (born October 12, 1951) is a contemporary sculptor born in Pink Lily, Alabama, who now lives and works in Selma, Alabama. He is owner and operator of the Tin Man Studio, part gallery and part studio, in Selma.

== Life ==
Charlie Lucas was born in Pink Lily, Alabama on October 12, 1951. He is a descendant of six generations of craftspeople. His mother and grandmother were skilled quilters and ceramicists while his maternal grandfather and great-grandfather were blacksmiths. In fact, his great-grandfather, King Lucas, made sculptures of his own from discarded metal. Other members of his family were basket weavers and woodcarvers. Lucas studied blacksmithing and metal works, in general, with his grandfather. It was through him that Lucas learned to make toys for other children and decided to pursue art as a career.

However, after Lucas completed the fourth grade in Elmore County, Alabama, he was scorned and ridiculed by a teacher for having the desire to be an artist. After this humiliation, Lucas ran away from home at fourteen and began performing technical labor, such as landscaping, car mechanics, truck driving, and construction. Three years later, at seventeen, he had settled in Florida working for a food manufacturer. At twenty-years-old, he returned to Alabama and began building a house in Pink Lily, Alabama (outside Prattville) across the street from his grandmother's house. The same year, he married Annie Marie Lykes. Together they had four sons and two daughters, some of whom help him construct his sculptures today. After their children grew up, Annie Marie and Lucas divorced, but he maintains a studio on their property in Prattville, where Annie Marie also works as an artist.

== Career ==
Lucas was the eldest of many siblings, and he spent much of his childhood entertaining and making toys for other children. In 1984, at 33-years-old, Lucas fell off of the back of a truck on a construction site and was left permanently disabled. He was bed-ridden for nearly three years. Through his recovery, he found his artistic practice once again. He calls his artistic process "recycling himself" and his humanoid figures sculpted from recycled mechanical parts echo his sentiment. He refers to his sculptures as "toys," continuing the practice he began in childhood, and he refers to himself as "The Tin Man". He now owns and operates Tin Man Studio, a gallery and studio, in Selma, Alabama. Although he now lives in Selma, he maintains his five-acre property in Pink Lily. His property stretches across both sides of the road that runs through Pink Lily. His family home sits on one side and on the other sits sprawling fields and rolling hills where Lucas has built a sculpture garden within a subsistence garden. His sculptures of giant masks and dinosaurs sit among corn, squash, and peanut crops.

=== Inspiration ===
Lucas's main artistic concern is communication. Growing up with dyslexia, which rendered him illiterate until recently, forced Lucas to rely on visual and aural ways of communication. According to him, this is what has made him the artist and storyteller he is. Lucas makes his art "as toys to play with" through which he hopes "his culture, passion for mankind, and desire for 'social unity'" shine through. He also makes these sculptures as friends, with which he can share his own dialogue, "and who can teach him lessons about life."

=== Sculpture ===
Lucas's largest sculptures are of people and animals constructed from welded metal bands. The negative space between the metal bands give the works a "light and airy appearance." An example of this work is an eight-foot tall reptilian sculpture displayed on Lucas's property in Pink Lily.

The smaller sculptures are made from welded recycled automobile and bicycle parts. Lucas frequently used bicycle wheels to convey stunted social and physical mobility, as evidenced by Three Way Bicycle and Old Wheel Don't Roll No More.

=== Painting ===
Though his abstract and figurative paintings are less well known compared to his sculptures, he has made hundreds of them. He paints with house paint and acrylic on canvas, cardboard panel, and other found materials. His ongoing "TV Snacks" series are a combination of drawing and painting, usually made while he watches TV. "When I say TV snacks, it's kind of like saying, I don't even have to think about it cuz once you turn the TV on you're not in control of seeing what comes on the TV. So I'm letting my brain be the same way. I'm not trying to set it here or set it there, I'm just letting it flow like the TV doing. So that's why it's called the TV Snacks."

=== Exhibitions and permanent collections ===
Lucas's work has been featured in the following exhibitions:

- Redemption Songs: Outsider Art from the Black Diaspora. Sep 17 – October 24, 1987, Cavin- Morris Gallery, New York City.
- Southern Folk Art Festival: Richard Burnside, Charlie Lucas, Sam Doyle, Z.B. Armstrong, Mose Tolliver, Howard Finster. December 4, 1987– January 6, 1988, Fay Gold Gallery, Atlanta, GA.
- Outside the Mainstream; Folk Art in Our Time. May–Aug. 1988, High Museum of Art, Atlanta, GA.
- O Appalachia: Artists of the Southern Mountains. 1989, Huntington Museum of Art, Huntington, WV.
- Another Face of the Diamond: Pathways Through the Black Atlantic South. 1989, New Visions Gallery, New York: INTAR.
- Orphans in the Storm. Nov. 1 – December 31, 1991. 10 2 1 Gallery, Birmingham, AL.
- Another Perspective. In Search of an 'Authentic' Vision. Decoding the Appeal of the Self-Taught African- American Artist. 1991, National Museum of American Art, Smithsonian Institution, Washington D.C.
- Ashe: Improvisation & Recycling in African-American Visionary Art. Feb 2 – March 29, 1993. Diggs Gallery, Winston- Salem, NC.
- Passionate Visions of the American South: Self-Taught Artists from 1940 to the Present. 1993, New Orleans Museum of Art, New Orleans, LA.
- Not by Luck: Self-Taught Artists in the American South. 1993, Hunterdon Art Center, Clinton, NJ.
- Black History and Artistry: Work by Self-Taught Painters and Sculptors from the Blanchard-Hill Collection. Feb. 5 – March 3, 1993, Baruch College, New York.
- Pictured in My Mind: Contemporary American Self-Taught Art from the collection of Dr. Kurt Gitter and Alice Rae Yelen. 1995, Birmingham Museum of Art, Birmingham, AL.
- Accounts Southeast: Charlie Lucas. Oct. 1995, Southeast Center for Contemporary Art, Winston-Salem, NC.
- Wrestling with History: A Celebration of African American Self-Taught Artists from the Collection of Ronald and June Shelp. 1996, Baruch College, New York.
- Southern Spirit: The Hill Collection. Feb 21 – March 31, 2000, Museum of Art, Tallahassee, FL.
- Alabama Art 2000. 2000, Museum of the N. A. L. L. Art Association, Vence (France).
- Celebrating the vision: Self-Taught Artists of Alabama. Apr. 4–11 May 2000, Jemison- Carnegie Heritage Hall. Talladega, AL.
- Four Outsider Artists: The End is a New Beginning: Lonnie Holley, Mr. Imagination, Norbert Knox, Charlie Lucas. 2001, Zoellner Art Center, Lehigh University, Bethlehem, PA.
- Testimony: Vernacular Art of the African American South: The Ronald and June Shelp Collection. 2001–2004, traveling exhibition.
- Gathering. Sep. 9 – November 19, 2004, Dalton Gallery, Agnes Scott College, Decatur, GA.
- Stories of Community: Self-Taught Art from the Hill Collection. Aug. 12 – October 30, 2004, Museum of Arts and Sciences, Macon, GA.
- Coming Home: Self-Taught Artists, the Bible and the American South. Jun 19 – November 13, 2004, Art Museum of the University of Memphis, Memphis, TN.
- Courageous Journey: Honoring Rosa Parks. December 1, 2005– January 17, 2006, Alabama Artists Gallery, Montgomery, AL.
- Menagerie: Artists Look at Animals. Aug 3 – October 22, 2006, Museum of Craft and Folk Art. San Francisco, CA.
- Alabama Originals: Self Taught/Contemporary Folk Art. November 12, 2006– January 5, 2007, Alabama Artists Gallery, Montgomery, AL.
- Alabama Folk Art. Feb. 12 – December 30, 2007, Birmingham Museum of Art, Birmingham, AL.
- Ogun Meets Vulcan: Iron Sculpture of Alabama. 2007, Ogden Museum of Southern Art. New Orleans, LA
- Amazing Grace: Self-Taught Artists from the Mullis Collection. September 29, 2007– January 6, 2008, Georgia Museum of Art, Athens, GA.
- Roots of the Spirit: Lonnie Holley, Mr. Imagination, Charlie Lucas and Kevin Sampson. Jun 5 – July 31, 2011, L'Espace Re-Evolution. Venice (Italy)
- Outsider Visions: Self-Taught Southern Artists of the Twentieth Century. September 21, 2011– January 8, 2012, Boca Raton Museum of Art, Boca Raton, FL.
- The Music Lives On: Folk Song Traditions Told by Alabama Artists. Apr. 21 – July 14, 2012, Wiregrass Museum of Art, Dothan, AL.
- African-American Art from the Permanent Collection. 2012, Mobile Museum of Art, Mobile, AL.
- The Roots of the Spirit: Lonnie Holley, Mr. Imagination, Charlie Lucas and Kevin Sampson. Sep. 19 – November 26, 2014, Weigand Gallery, Notre Dame de Namur University, Belmont, CA.
- Charlie "Tin Man" Lucas: The Art of the Spirit. Sep. 2014, Prattville Creative Arts Center. Prattville, AL.
- History Refused to Die. 2015, Alabama Contemporary Art Center, Mobile, AL.
- Our Faith Affirmed- Works from the Collection of Gordon W. Bailey. September 10, 2014 – August 8, 2015, University of Mississippi Museum of Art. Oxford, MS.
- Ephemory. July 16 – September 20, 2023, DOOM SPA, Berlin, Germany.
- TV Snacks and Spirit Box. March 30 – April 28, 2024, DOOM SPA, Berlin, Germany.

=== Permanent collections ===
Lucas's work can be found in the permanent collections of the following museums:

- High Museum of Art
- Montgomery Museum of Fine Arts
- Birmingham Museum of Art
