= Prattville, Alabama =

City in Autauga and Elmore counties, Alabama, U.S.

Prattville
- City
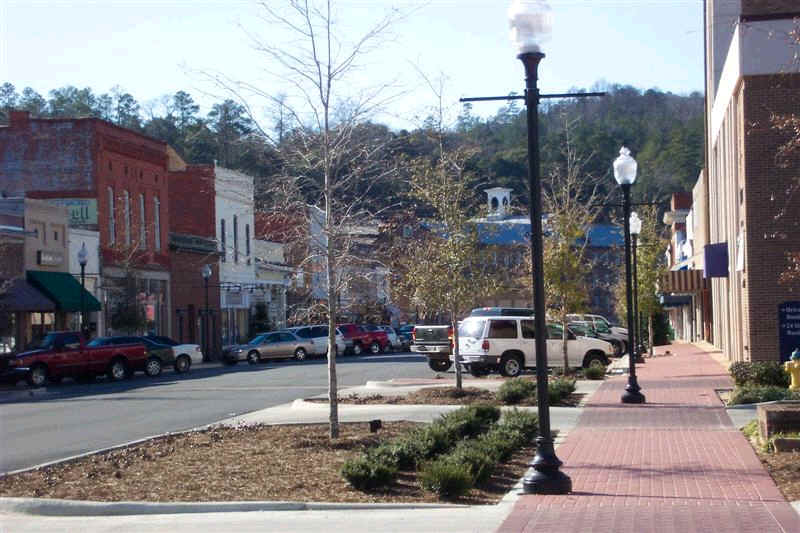
- Downtown Prattville

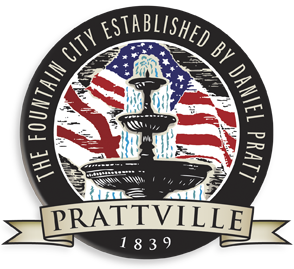
- Flag Seal
- Nickname: The Fountain City
- Motto: "The Preferred Community"
- Location of Prattville in Autauga County and Elmore County, Alabama.
- Coordinates: 32°27′53″N 86°27′25″W
- Country: United States
- State: Alabama
- Counties: Autauga, Elmore
- Founded: 1839
- Named for: Daniel Pratt

Government
  - Type: Mayor-council

Area
  - Total: 36.29 sq mi (94.00 km^{2})
  - Land: 35.41 sq mi (91.71 km^{2})
  - Water: 0.88 sq mi (2.29 km^{2})
- Elevation: 276 ft (84 m)

Population (2020)
  - Total: 37,781
  - Density: 1,067.0/sq mi (411.96/km^{2})
- Time zone: UTC−6 (CST)
  - Summer (DST): UTC−5 (CDT)
- ZIP codes: 36066-36068
- Area code: 334
- FIPS code: 01-62328
- GNIS feature ID: 2404568
- Website: www.prattvilleal.gov

Prattville is a city located within both Autauga and Elmore counties in the State of Alabama, United States, and serves as the county seat of Autauga County. As of the 2020 census, the population of the city was 37,781. Nicknamed "The Fountain City" due to the many artesian wells in the area, Prattville is part of the Montgomery Metropolitan Area. It was founded by Daniel Pratt.

== History ==
Prattville was founded in 1839 by industrialist and architect Daniel Pratt. The area was largely inhabited by Native Americans and a few settlers when Pratt, a native of Temple, New Hampshire, first observed the Autauga Creek in the 1830s. He purchased approximately 1,000 acres (4.0 km^{2}) from Joseph May at $21.00 an acre, and set out to build his manufacturing facilities and the town along the banks of Autauga Creek. The location was chosen because the creek could supply power to the cotton gin manufacturing equipment. The town became an industrial center and rapidly grew. In 1868, it was named the county seat for Autauga County.

Prattville contains several sites on the National Register of Historic Places, including the Daniel Pratt Historic District, Bell House and Buena Vista.

== Geography ==
Prattville has a total area of 33.8 square miles (88 km^{2}) of which 32.9 square miles (85 km^{2}) is land and 0.9 square miles (2.3 km^{2}) (3.09%) is water. The city is located northwest of Montgomery and along Interstate 65 and U.S. Route 82. I-65 runs north to south east of downtown, with access from exits 179 and 181, both in the Elmore County portion of the city. I-65 leads southeast 14 mi (23 km) to downtown Montgomery and north 82 mi (132 km) to Birmingham. US 82 runs south with I-65 to downtown Montgomery, and northwest 89 mi (143 km) to Tuscaloosa.

== Demographics ==
Historical population
Census	Pop.	Note	%±
1850	672		—
1870	1,346		—
1880	977		−27.4%
1890	724		−25.9%
1900	1,929		166.4%
1910	2,222		15.2%
1920	2,316		4.2%
1930	2,331		0.6%
1940	2,664		14.3%
1950	4,385		64.6%
1960	6,616		50.9%
1970	13,116		98.2%
1980	18,647		42.2%
1990	19,587		5.0%
2000	24,303		24.1%
2010	33,960		39.7%
2020	37,781		11.3%
2025 (est.)	40,582	▲	7.4%
U.S. Decennial Census; 2018 Estimate

=== 2020 census ===
As of the 2020 census, Prattville had a population of 37,781. The median age was 37.6 years. 24.4% of residents were under the age of 18 and 15.2% of residents were 65 years of age or older. For every 100 females there were 90.5 males, and for every 100 females age 18 and over there were 86.9 males age 18 and over.

92.7% of residents lived in urban areas, while 7.3% lived in rural areas.

There were 14,624 households, including 9,658 families. 34.9% had children under the age of 18 living in them. Of all households, 50.3% were married-couple households, 15.5% were households with a male householder and no spouse or partner present, and 29.7% were households with a female householder and no spouse or partner present. About 25.4% of all households were made up of individuals and 10.0% had someone living alone who was 65 years of age or older.

There were 15,537 housing units, of which 5.9% were vacant. The homeowner vacancy rate was 1.3% and the rental vacancy rate was 5.9%.

Racial composition as of the 2020 census
Race	Number	Percent
White	25,984	68.8%
Black or African American	7,978	21.1%
American Indian and Alaska Native	137	0.4%
Asian	863	2.3%
Native Hawaiian and Other Pacific Islander	30	0.1%
Some other race	642	1.7%
Two or more races	2,147	5.7%
Hispanic or Latino (of any race)	1,516	4.0%

=== 2010 census ===
As of the census of 2010, there were 33,960 people, 12,711 households, and 9,305 families residing in Prattville. The population density was 1,033.6 inhabitants per square mile (399.1/km^{2}). There were 13,541 housing units at an average density of 412.1 per square mile (159.1/km^{2}). The racial makeup of the city was 78.5% White, 16.7% Black or African American, 0.4% Native American, 1.4% Asian, 0.1% Pacific Islander, 1.1% from other races, and 1.8% from two or more races. 3.1% of the population were Hispanic or Latino of any race.

There were 12,711 households, out of which 35.5% had children under the age of 18 living with them, 55.1% were married couples living together, 4.1% had a male householder with no wife present, 14.0% had a female householder with no husband present, and 26.8% were non-families. 22.9% of all households were made up of individuals, and 7.9% had someone living alone who was 65 years of age or older. The average household size was 2.64 and the average family size was 3.12.

In the city, the age distribution of the population showed 27.1% under the age of 18, 8.5% from 18 to 24, 27.9% from 25 to 44, 24.6% from 45 to 64, and 11.9% who were 65 years of age or older. The median age was 36.3 years. For every 100 females, there were 91.1 males. For every 100 females age 18 and over, there were 87.6 males.

=== 2000 census ===
In 2000, the median income for a household in the city was $45,728, and the median income for a family was $51,774. Males had a median income of $36,677 versus $22,978 for females. The per capita income for the city was $19,832. 8.3% of the population and 6.4% of families were below the poverty line. Out of the total population, 9.3% of those under the age of 18 and 9.2% of those 65 and older were living below the poverty line.

== Climate ==
According to the Köppen climate classification, Prattville has a humid subtropical climate (abbreviated Cfa).

Climate data for Prattville, 1991–2020 simulated normals (200 ft elevation)
Month	Jan	Feb	Mar	Apr	May	Jun	Jul	Aug	Sep	Oct	Nov	Dec	Year
Mean daily maximum °F (°C)	57.6 (14.2)	62.2 (16.8)	69.8 (21.0)	76.6 (24.8)	84.0 (28.9)	89.4 (31.9)	91.6 (33.1)	91.4 (33.0)	87.4 (30.8)	78.1 (25.6)	67.6 (19.8)	59.7 (15.4)	76.3 (24.6)
Daily mean °F (°C)	46.9 (8.3)	51.1 (10.6)	58.1 (14.5)	64.8 (18.2)	72.9 (22.7)	79.5 (26.4)	81.9 (27.7)	81.5 (27.5)	76.8 (24.9)	66.6 (19.2)	55.8 (13.2)	49.3 (9.6)	65.4 (18.6)
Mean daily minimum °F (°C)	36.5 (2.5)	39.7 (4.3)	46.2 (7.9)	52.9 (11.6)	61.7 (16.5)	69.4 (20.8)	72.1 (22.3)	71.6 (22.0)	66.4 (19.1)	55.0 (12.8)	43.7 (6.5)	38.8 (3.8)	54.5 (12.5)
Average precipitation inches (mm)	5.27 (133.86)	5.38 (136.54)	5.44 (138.12)	4.46 (113.19)	4.00 (101.52)	4.97 (126.30)	5.09 (129.33)	4.55 (115.45)	3.78 (96.01)	3.11 (79.12)	4.14 (105.25)	5.39 (137.01)	55.58 (1,411.7)
Average dew point °F (°C)	37.6 (3.1)	40.6 (4.8)	45.7 (7.6)	52.7 (11.5)	61.2 (16.2)	68.2 (20.1)	71.4 (21.9)	70.7 (21.5)	65.8 (18.8)	55.9 (13.3)	45.9 (7.7)	40.8 (4.9)	54.7 (12.6)
Source: Prism Climate Group

=== Severe weather ===
On February 17, 2008, Prattville was hit by an EF3 tornado which destroyed more than 45 homes and businesses and damaged over 700. Twenty-nine people were injured with no fatalities. Preliminary estimates put the damage at $85 million in insured and uninsured damages.

== Education ==
Most of Prattville (the Autauga County portion) is part of the Autauga County School System, and has eight schools, including Prattville High School and the Autauga County Technology Center. The Elmore County portion is in the Elmore County Public School System.

Prattville Christian Academy and Autauga Academy are private schools based in the city. East Memorial Christian Academy was located in an unincorporated area of Autauga County, near Prattville, until it was closed down.

== Emergency services ==
Fire protection and Emergency Medical Services in Prattville are provided by the Prattville Fire Department.

Law enforcement agency is the Prattville Police Department.

== Media ==
Prattville is part of the Montgomery television market. WOW! (formerly Knology) and Charter provide cable television service. DirecTV and Dish Network provide direct broadcast satellite television including both local and national channels to area residents. Prattville is also served by the twice-weekly Prattville Progress newspaper.

== Recreation ==
The city has become a popular golf destination, featuring the Capitol Hill golf courses (part of the Robert Trent Jones Golf Trail). Its Senator Course hosted the Navistar (now Yokohama Tire) LPGA Classic on the LPGA Tour from 2007 through 2012 when Navistar ended its sponsorship. There was no LPGA event at this course in 2013. The 2014 event, now known as the Yokohama Tire LPGA Classic after its new sponsor, was scheduled for September 18–21.

High Point Town Center is a large shopping center built in Prattville between 2007 and 2008. 10,000-capacity Stanley-Jensen Stadium is located in Prattville. It is mainly used for football and soccer.

== Transportation ==
Major highways that pass through the city include:

- I-65
- US 31
- US 82
- SR 14

Prattville also has a small airport about 3.5 miles from downtown.

Autauga County Rural Transportation provides dial-a-ride transit service in the city and county.

== Historical markers ==
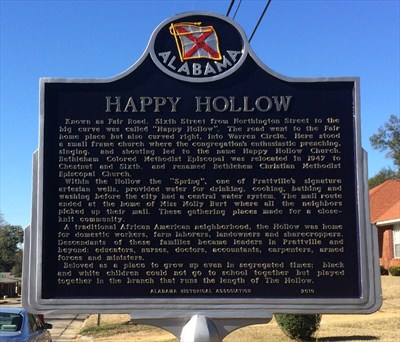
Historical Marker

=== Happy Hollow ===
Known for the signature hill that turns into a steep curve, located on present-day 6th Street, Happy Hollow was the center of African American life in Prattville in the 1950s. This marker was erected to honor the spirit of "equality" that resonated in Happy Hollow.

== Notable people ==
- Marlon Anderson, Major League Baseball player
- Kaitlan Collins, journalist
- Evan Crawford, Major League Baseball player
- John Coleman Darnell, Egyptologist
- Steve Gainer, Cinematographer
- Bobby Greenwood, NFL offensive tackle
- Roman Harper, NFL player.
- C. M. Hazen, head coach for the University of Richmond football team
- O. J. Howard, former Tight End for the Alabama Crimson Tide.
- Randy Hunt, former Major League Baseball catcher
- Charlie Lucas, sculptor
- Nick Perry, NFL player and coach
- Wilson Pickett, R&B and soul singer and songwriter
- Tommy Shaw, member of the band Styx
- Brandon Taylor, author
- Daniel Holcombe Thomas, chief judge of the U.S. District Court for the Southern District of Alabama
- Trust Company, alternative rock/post-grunge band
- Kevin Turner, NFL player
- Ernie Wingard, pitcher for the St. Louis Browns from 1924 to 1927
- Zac Woodfin, NFL player.

== Popular culture ==
Gabriel García Marquez mentions Prattville in his well-known work One Hundred Years of Solitude; Prattville is referred to as the original city of Jack Brown, the founder of the banana company.

== Folklore ==
A popular ghost story known as "The Black Lady," inspired by deaths caused by poor working conditions in the nearby factories of downtown Prattville, is a popular phenomenon described by most as a black, ghastly figure that goes across the nearby dam during the night hours of 1 am to 4 am and has been featured on the ghost hunting show, Deep South Paranormal.

This story, and additional Prattville ghost stories are cited by Digital Alabama.

== Gallery ==
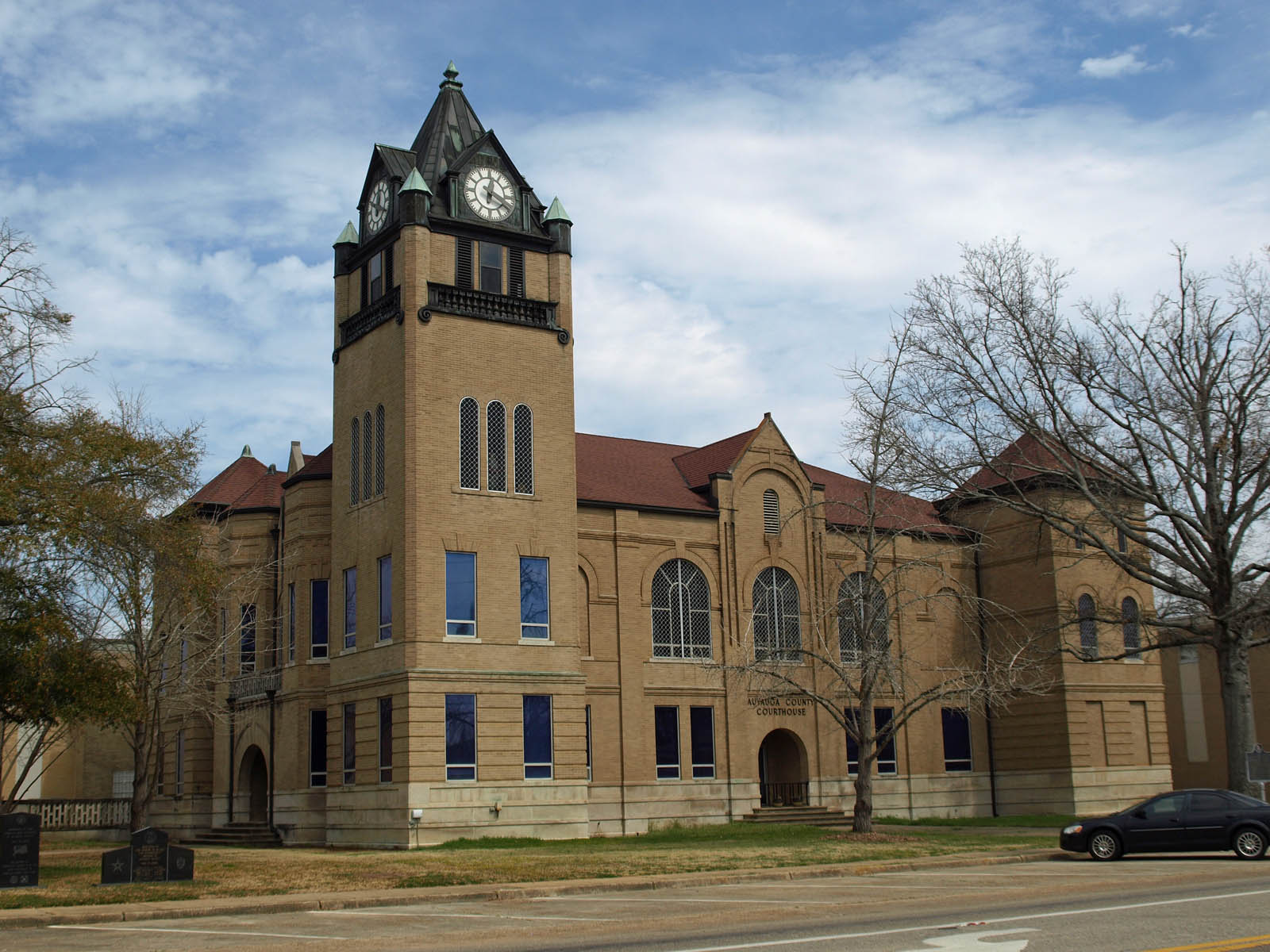
Autauga County Courthouse

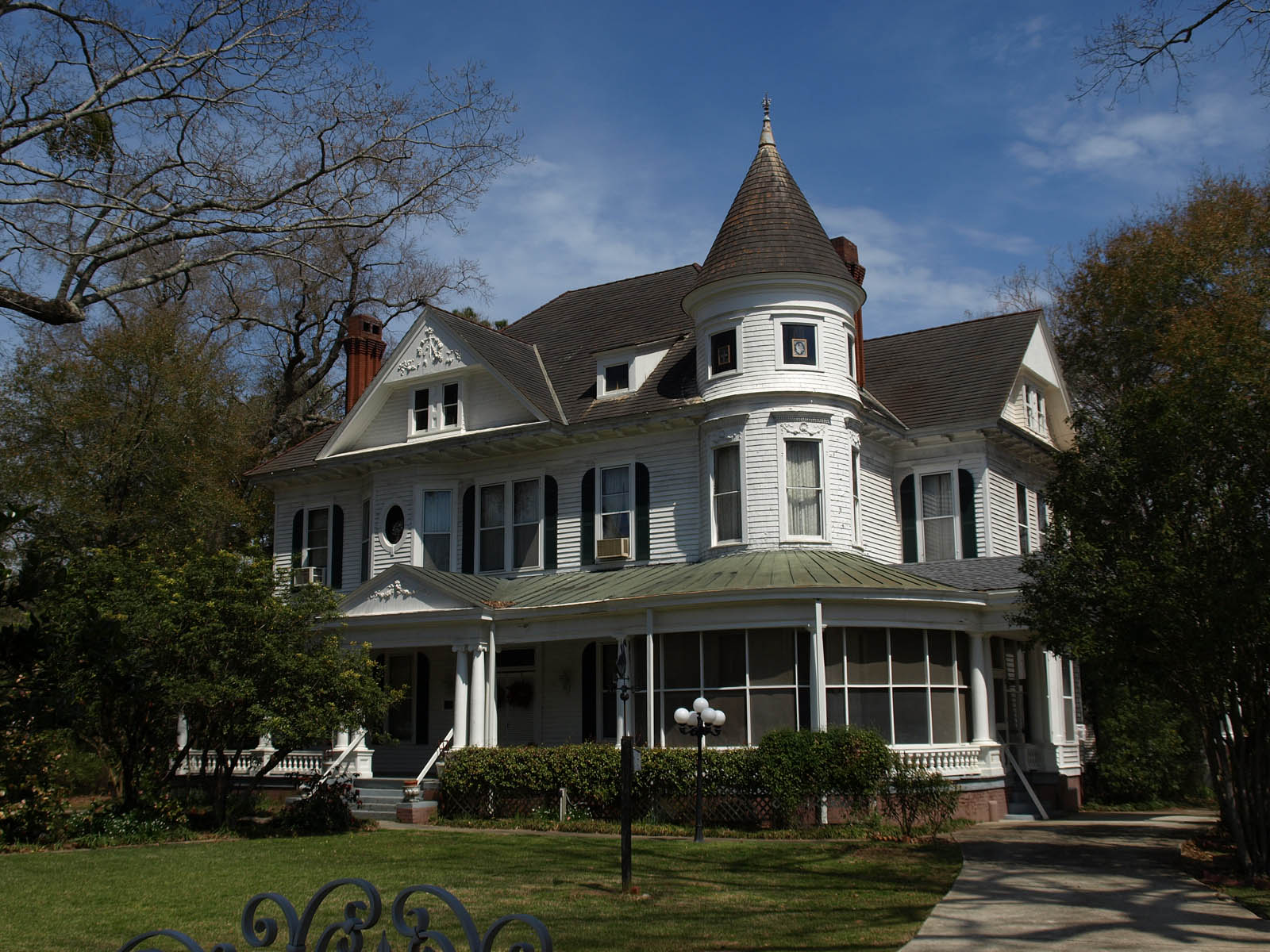
Bell House

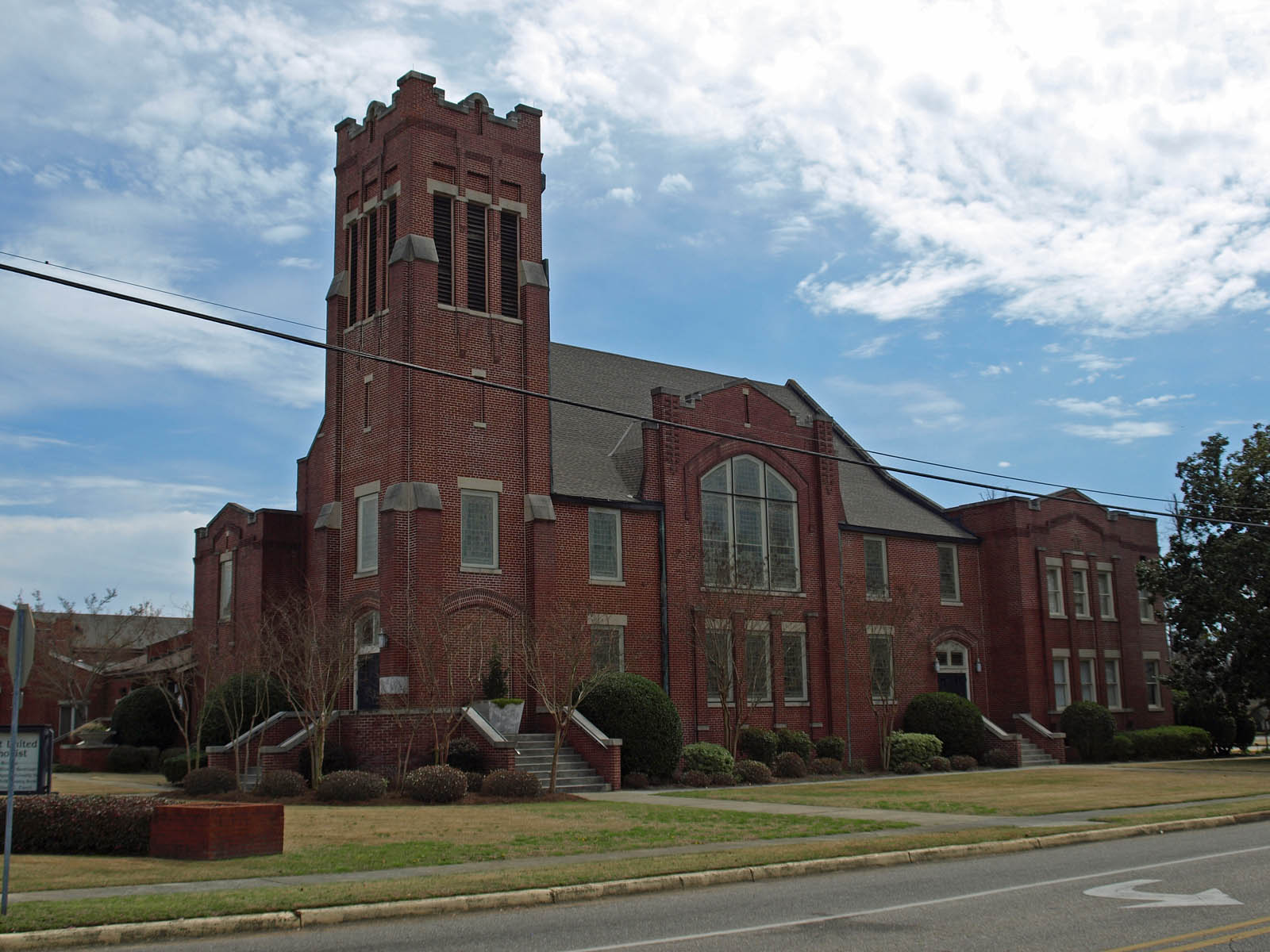
Prattville First Methodist Church

=== 1938 flooding ===
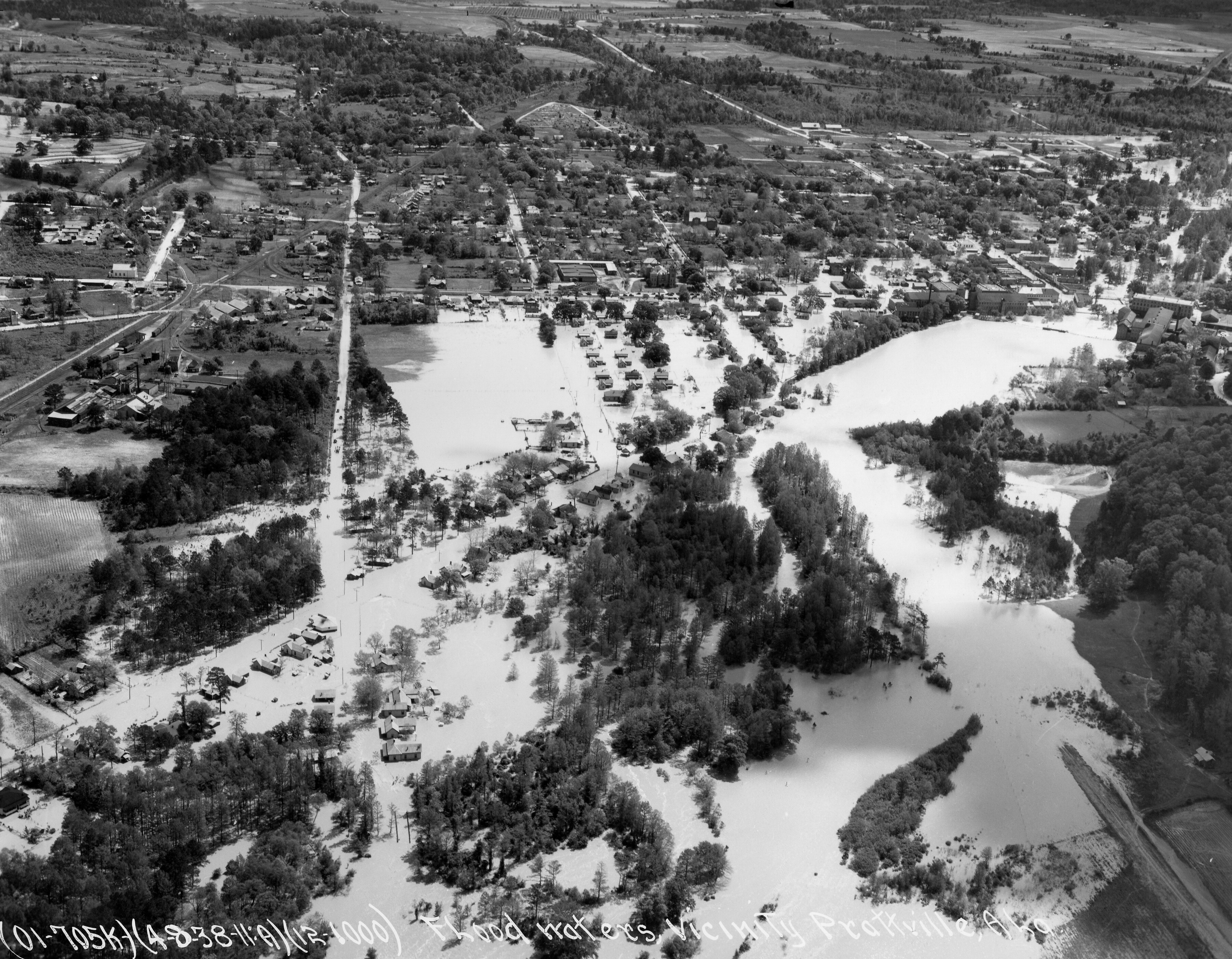

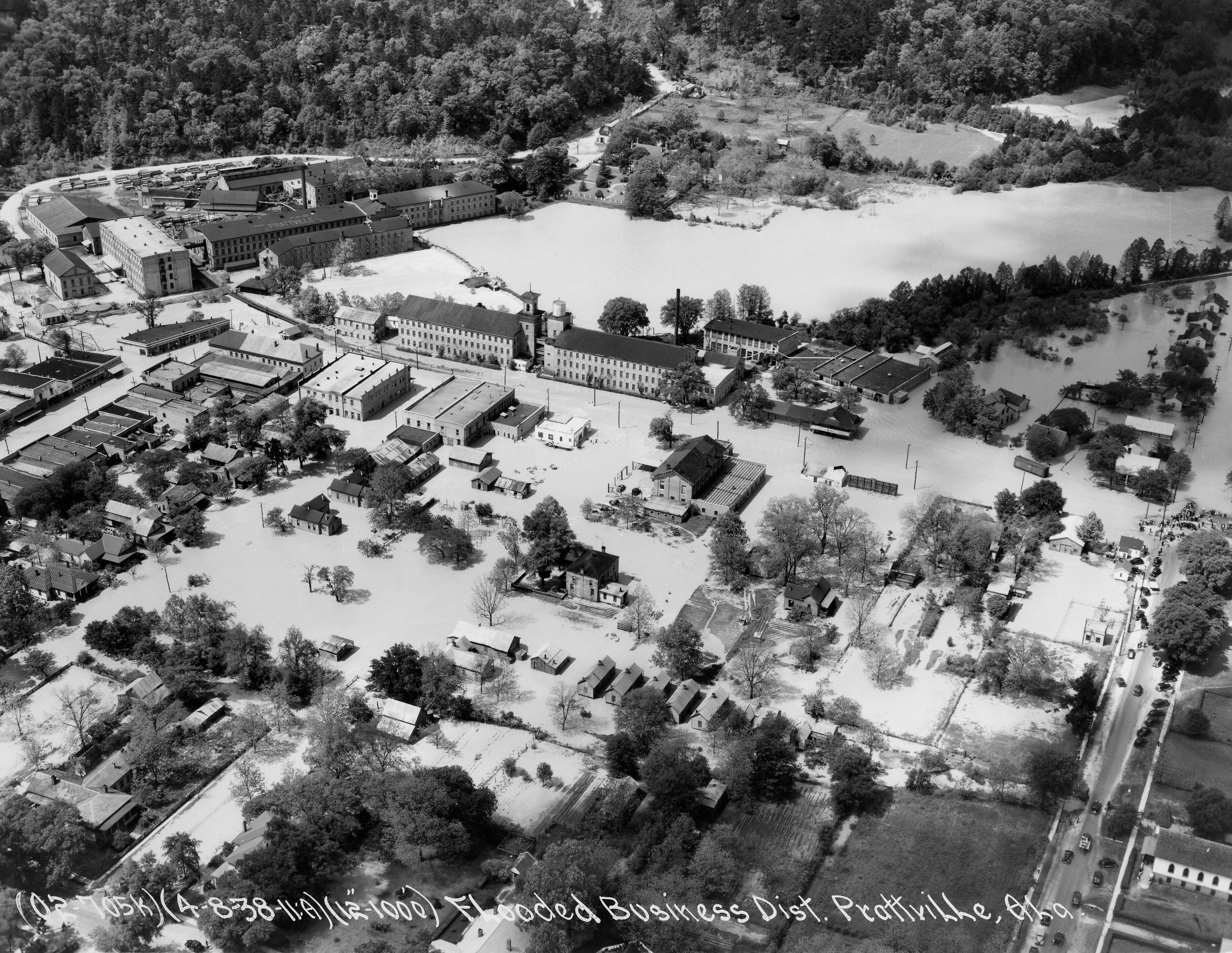

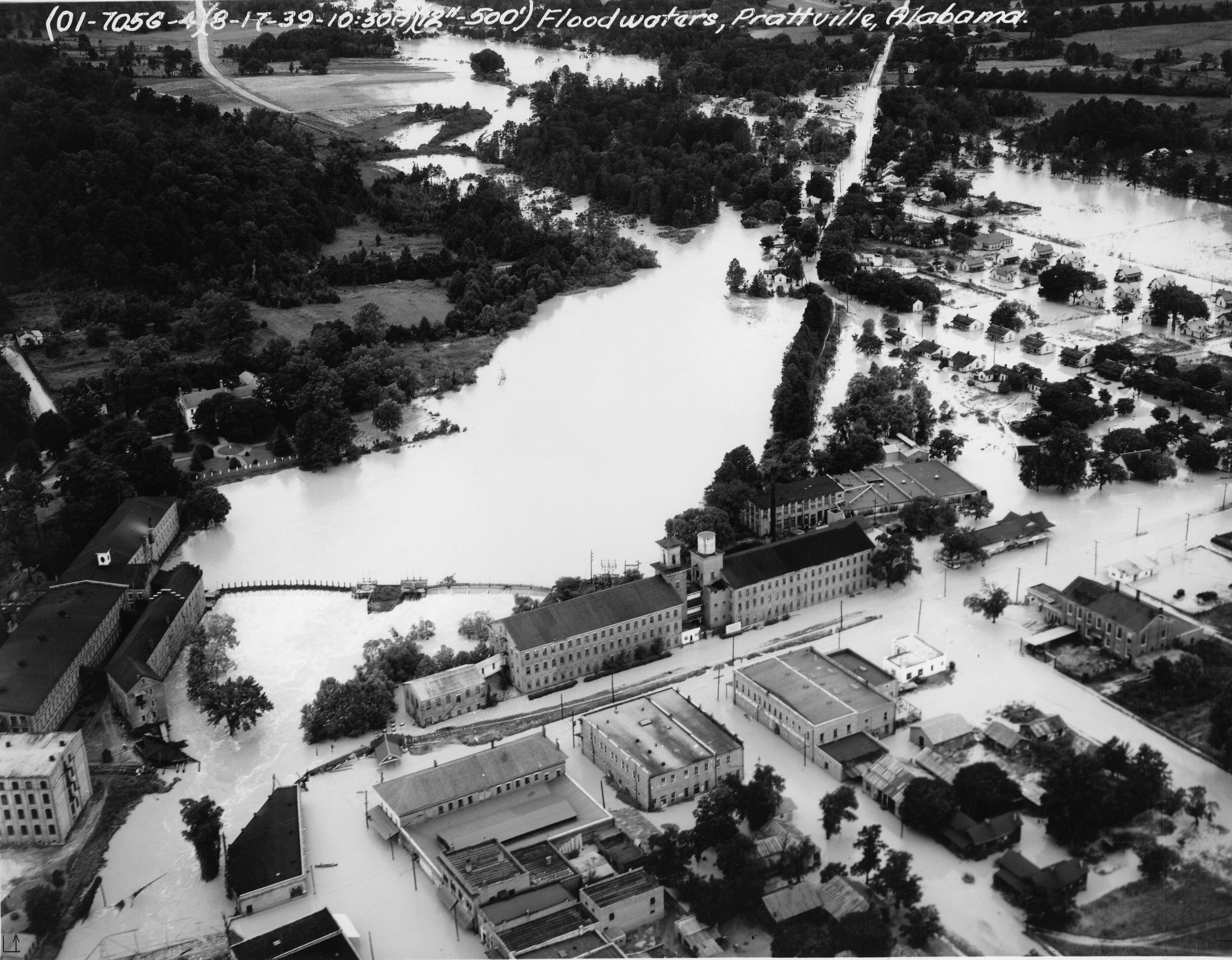
