= Greenwood (surname) =

- Language: English

Origin
- Language: English
- Origin: Greenwood, Heptonstall
- Meaning: "green wood"

Other names
- Variant form: Greenwode

Greenwood is a British surname, believed to be derived from the Greenwood or Greenwode settlement near Heptonstall in the metropolitan district of Calderdale in West Yorkshire. It was the homestead of Wyomarus de Greenwode, believed to be the principal ancestor of British Greenwoods, though some claim to be of French descent.

== Surname ==
- Al Greenwood (born 1951), American keyboard player
- Alex Greenwood (disambiguation), several people
- Alfred B. Greenwood (1811–1889), American lawyer and politician
- Alice Greenwood (1862–1935), British historian, teacher and writer
- Arthur Greenwood (1880–1954), British politician
- Arthur H. Greenwood (1880–1963), American politician
- Bob Greenwood (baseball) (1928–1994), Mexican Major League Baseball player
- Bobby Greenwood (golfer) (born 1938), American golfer
- Bobby Greenwood (American football) (born 1987), American football offensive tackle
- Sir Brian Greenwood (born 1938), British physician, biomedical researcher, and medical school professor
- Bruce Greenwood (born 1956), Canadian film actor
- Caleb Greenwood, trapper, guide, and early pioneer of the American West
- Charlotte Greenwood (1890–1977), American actress
- Chester Greenwood (1858–1937), American inventor of earmuffs
- Christopher (1786–1855) and John Greenwood (fl. 1821–1840), English cartographers
- Clarence Greenwood alias Citizen Cope, American musician
- Colin Greenwood (rugby), South African rugby footballer
- Colin Greenwood (born 1969), British bassist for Radiohead
- David Greenwood (1957–2025), American basketball player
- David Greenwood (bishop) (born 1963), Canadian Anglican bishop
- Debbie Greenwood, British television presenter
- Dick Greenwood (born 1940), English rugby union footballer
- Doctor Greenwood (1860–1951), Blackburn Rovers and England international footballer
- Don Greenwood (disambiguation), several people
- Duncan Greenwood (1919–1992), English playwright
- Ed Greenwood (born 1959), Canadian library clerk, inventor of the Forgotten Realms Dungeons & Dragons campaign setting
- Elizabeth W. Greenwood (1849–1922), American social reformer
- Elizabeth Greenwood (1873–1961), New Zealand photographer
- Emily Greenwood, American classicist
- F. W. P. Greenwood (1797–1843), American minister
- Frederick Greenwood (1830–1909), English journalist
- Gordon Arthur Greenwood, Australian pastoralist and prospector, son of William Bentley Greenwood
- Grace Greenwood (1905–1979), also known as Grace Greenwood Ames and Grace Crampton, an American artist, social realist artist and muralist.
- Grace Greenwood, a pseudonym for Sara Jane Lippincott (1823–1904), American writer
- Harry Greenwood (1881–1948), English soldier, recipient of the Victoria Cross
- Harry Greenwood (actor), Australian stage and film actor
- Humphry Greenwood (1927–1995), English ichthyologist
- Irene Greenwood (1898–1992), Australian radio broadcaster and feminist and peace activist
- Ivor Greenwood (1926–1976), Australian Senator and Attorney General (1971, 1972, and 1975)
- Jack Greenwood (soccer player) (born 1999), Australian soccer player
- James Greenwood (journalist) (1832–1929), British journalist and writer
- James C. Greenwood (born 1951), American politician from the state of Pennsylvania
- Janinka Greenwood (born 1947), Czech–New Zealand educator, playwright and poet
- Joan Greenwood (1921–1987), British actress
- Joan Greenwood (Oklahoma politician) (born 1942), American politician
- John Greenwood (Puritan), (died 1593), English Puritan and Separatist
- John Greenwood (dentist) (1760–1819), George Washington's dentist, the "Father of Modern Dentistry" and Revolutionary War patriot
- John Greenwood (composer), English composer of classical and film music
- John Greenwood (artist), colonial American artist
- John Greenwood (bus operator) (died 1851), a pioneer of omnibus services in England
- John Greenwood (executive) (1950–2008), catering executive
- John Greenwood (cricketer, born 1851) (1851–1935), cricketer
- John Greenwood (lawyer) (1800–1871), English lawyer and sportsman
- John Greenwood, pseudonym of John Buxton Hilton, British crime writer
- John Greenwood (MP), (1824–1874), British politician
- Jonny Greenwood (born 1971), musician and composer, most notable as a member of Radiohead
- Joseph Greenwood (died 1861), New Zealand politician and soldier
- Kathy Greenwood (born 1962), Canadian comedian
- Kerry Greenwood (1954–2025), Australian author and lawyer; author of the "Phryne Fisher" mystery series
- Kyle Greenwood (born 1987), Canadian professional wrestler better known as Kyle O'Reilly
- L. C. Greenwood (1946–2013), American football player
- Laura Greenwood (born 1991), English actress
- Lee Greenwood (born 1942), American singer and composer
- Leonard Greenwood (classicist) (1880–1965), New Zealander classical scholar
- Leonard Greenwood (cricketer) (1899–1982), English cricketer and schoolteacher
- Lisa Greenwood (born 1955), New Zealand novelist
- Major Greenwood (1880–1949), English epidemiologist and statistician
- Makayla Greenwood, American taekwondo practitioner
- Marilyn Greenwood (born 1946), British tennis player
- Marion Greenwood (1909–1970), American social realist muralist, painter and printmaker
- Marvin I. Greenwood (1840–1917), American lawyer and politician
- Mason Greenwood (born 2001), English footballer
- Merle Greenwood (1900–1990), Australian-born New Zealand architect
- Morlon Greenwood (born 1978), American footballer
- Nick Greenwood (born 1987), American Baseball player
- Nimrod Greenwood (1929–2016), Australian rower
- Norman Greenwood (1925–2012), Australian-British chemist
- Paul Greenwood (money manager) (born 1947), American money manager convicted of securities fraud
- Peter Greenwood (1962–2021), Australian actor
- Peter Greenwood (footballer) (1924–2021), English footballer and cricketer
- Randall Greenwood, American politician
- Reeva Greenwood (1893–1972), American actress
- Robin Greenwood (born 1977), American economist
- Ron Greenwood (1921–2006), manager of the England national football team
- Ross Greenwood (footballer) (born 1985), English footballer
- Ross Greenwood (journalist) (born 1959), Australian journalist
- Sam Greenwood (poker player) (born 1988), Canadian professional poker player
- Sam Greenwood (footballer) (born 2002), English footballer
- Sarah Greenwood (born 1960), English production designer
- Sarah Greenwood (artist) (1809–1889), New Zealand pioneer
- Sina Greenwood, New Zealand mathematician
- Thomas Greenwood (activist) (1908–1988), American labor and Indian affairs activist
- Thomas Greenwood (historian) (1790–1871), English barrister and academic
- Thomas Greenwood (publisher) (1851–1908), English publisher
- Thomas B. Greenwood (1872–1946), Justice of the Supreme Court of Texas
- Thomas E. Greenwood (1859–1934), Canadian farmer, grain dealer and political figure
- Thomas Greenwood (physicist) (1901-1963), Canadian physicist
- Tom Greenwood (bishop) (1903–1974), Canadian Anglican bishop
- Tom Greenwood (footballer) (1889–1935), Australian rules footballer
- Walter Greenwood (1903–1974), English novelist
- Will Greenwood (born 1972), English rugby union footballer, son of Dick Greenwood
- William Bentley Greenwood, Australian pastoralist and prospector, father of Gordon Arthur Greenwood

=== Fictional ===
- David Greenwood, a character from J. G. Ballard's Super-Cannes
- Deputy Clayton Thaddeus Greenwood, a regular cast character from the television show Gunsmoke
- Esther Greenwood, main character from Sylvia Plath's The Bell Jar
- Annie and Glen Greenwood, Jesse's foster parents in Free Willy

== Given name ==
- Greenwood LeFlore (1800–1865), an American Indian, Chief of the Choctaw tribe

== Peerages ==
- Hamar Greenwood, 1st Viscount Greenwood (1870–1948), British noble
- Tony Greenwood, Baron Greenwood of Rossendale (1911–1982), English politician
