= Thomas Greenwood =

Thomas Greenwood may refer to:

- Thomas Greenwood (activist) (1908–1988), American labor and Indian affairs activist
- Thomas Greenwood (historian) (1790–1871), English barrister and academic
- Thomas Greenwood (publisher) (1851–1908), English publisher
- Thomas B. Greenwood (1872–1946), Justice of the Supreme Court of Texas
- Thomas E. Greenwood (1859–1934), Canadian farmer, grain dealer and political figure
- Thomas Greenwood (physicist) (1901-1963), Canadian physicist
- Tom Greenwood (bishop) (1903–1974), Canadian Anglican bishop
- Tom Greenwood (footballer) (1889–1935), Australian rules footballer
