= Culver =

Culver may refer to:

== Places ==
=== United Kingdom ===
- Culver Down, Isle of Wight

=== United States ===
- Culver, Indiana, a town in northern Indiana
- Culver, Kansas, a city in north-central Kansas
- Culver, Kentucky, an unincorporated community
- Culver, Missouri, a ghost town
- Culver, Oregon, a city in central Oregon
- Culver, Minnesota, an unincorporated community in northeast Minnesota
- Culver Township, St. Louis County, Minnesota, a township in northeast Minnesota
- Culver City, California, a city in Los Angeles County; a significant center for motion picture and television production
  - Culver City station
- Culver Lake, a lake straddling the Minnesota-South Dakota line
- Culver Line (disambiguation), multiple transit lines in Brooklyn

== Other uses ==
- Culver (surname)
- Culver Academies (Culver Military Academy / Culver Girls Academy), a boarding school and summer camp program
- Culver Aircraft Company
- Culver Boulevard Median bicycle path
- Culver Drive, a major arterial road in Irvine, California
- Culver's, a restaurant chain in the United States
- Culver, a pigeon or a dove (less-common English word)
