= Frank Culver (disambiguation) =

Frank Culver (1897–1955) was a college football player and attorney.

Frank Culver may also refer to:

- Frank Culver (NFL) (1897–1969), professional football player
- Frank P. Culver (c. 1864–1949), president of Polytechnic College
- Frank P. Culver Jr. (1889–1980), Justice of the Texas Supreme Court
