= OMJ =

OMJ may refer to:

- Old Man Jenkins, a character from SpongeBob SquarePants
- Oman Medical Journal
- One Million Jobs Report, a report by British businessman Tony Michell
- "Oh Michael Jordan", a phrase from My Wife and Kids
