= Culver (surname) =

Culver is a surname that can mean "dove" or "pigeon" (see: culver). Notable people with the surname include:

- Andrew Culver (composer) (born 1953), Canadian-American composer and software entrepreneuer
- Andrew Culver (railroad executive) (1832–1906), founder of the Prospect Park and Coney Island Railroad
- Casse Culver (1944–2019), American singer, singwriter, and musician
- Chet Culver (born 1966), American politician from Iowa
- Ellsworth Culver (1927–2005), American humanitarian/aid worker and co-founder of Mercy Corps International
- Frank Culver (1897–1955), American college football player and attorney
- Frank Culver (NFL) (1897–1969), American professional football player
- Frank P. Culver (c. 1864–1949), president of Polytechnic College
- Frank P. Culver Jr. (1889–1980), American judge from Texas
- George Culver (born 1943), American Major League Baseball pitcher
- Harry Culver (1880–1946), American real-estate developer, founder of Culver City, California
- Henry Harrison Culver (1840–1897), founder of the Culver Military Academy in Culver, Indiana
- Jarrett Culver (born 1999), American basketball player
- John Culver (1932–2018), American politician from; father of Chet Culver
- Michael Culver (1938–2024), English actor
- Roland Culver (1900–1984), English actor
