= Bobby Greenwood =

Bobby Greenwood may refer to:

- Bobby Greenwood (golfer) (born 1938), American golfer
- Bobby Greenwood (American football) (born 1987), American football offensive tackle

== See also ==
- Greenwood (surname)
