= Order of Oman =

Second highest order of Oman

Civil Order of Oman وسام عمان المدني
- First Class Star

Awarded by Sultan of Oman
- Type: Order
- Established: 1970
- Country: Oman
- Royal house: Al Bu Sa'id
- Status: Currently constituted
- Founder: Sultan Qaboos bin Said
- Sovereign: Sultan Haitham bin Tariq
- Classes: 1st to 5th Class

Precedence
- Next (higher): Order of Al Said
- Next (lower): Order of Establishment
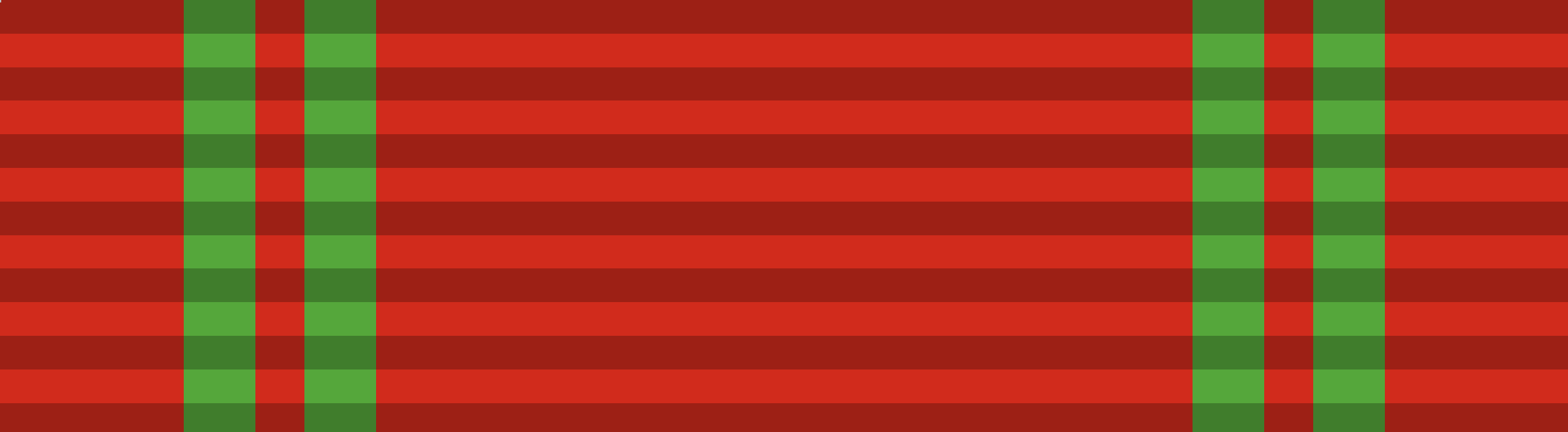
- Ribbon of the order

The Civil Order of Oman (Arabic: وسام عمان المدني, romanized: Wisam al-Oman al-Madaniu) is the second highest order of Oman.

== History ==
It was instituted in 1970 by Sultan Qaboos bin Said as a counterpart to the Military Order of Oman and is made up of five class. The first class is regularly awarded to foreign heads of state and high ranking members of the Omani royal family.

== Insignia ==
The insignia was created by Asprey and varies for each class.

=== First class ===
The first class insignia includes a collar with badge, sash with badge, breast star, and miniature. The breast star has six points shaped like domes in white enamel with crescents between each and a pearl at the end of each point. The center features an Arabic inscription surrounded by a row of diamonds and a row of green enamel. The collar is white gold with alternating links of circles and arabesques and a badge of the same design as the breast star. The sash is red with two green stripes near the edge. The sash badge is a six pointed star of similar design to the breast star but without the crescents between each point. The center is a white gold crescent on a green enamel background bordered by red enamel. The miniature has a smaller version of the sash badge.

=== Second class ===
The second class insignia includes a sash with badge, breast star, and miniature. The breast star has six points shaped like domes in white enamel with crescents between each point. The center features and Arabic inscription surrounded by a row of red and then green enamel. The sash is similar to the first class sash but narrower and its badge has five points instead of six. The badge of the miniature also only has five points.

=== Third class ===
The third class insignia includes a neck ribbon with badge and breast star. The breast star is the same as the second class one but without the crescents between each point. The ribbon only has one green stripe near the edge and the badge has five points with the center crescent on green enamel with red enamel border.

=== Fourth class ===
The fourth class insignia is a medal. The ribbon is red with a central green stripe and the badge is a five pointed star with domed shaped points in white enamel with the center crescent on a red enamel background bordered by green enamel.

=== Fifth class ===
The fifth class insginia is a medal of slightly smaller size than the fourth class medal. The ribbon is red with two narrow green stripes in the center. The badge is a smaller version of the fourth class medal.

Ribbon Bars of the Civil Order of Oman
First Class	Second Class	Third Class	Fourth Class	Fifth Class

== Notable recipients ==
=== First class ===
- Mohammad Reza Shah Pahlavi of Iran (1959)
- Queen Elizabeth II of the United Kingdom (1979)
- Sultan Hassanal Bolkiah of Brunei (1984)
- Sultan Azlan Shah of Perak (1991)
- Emperor Akihito of Japan (1994)
- Emir Hamad bin Khalifa Al Thani of Qatar (1995)
- President Nelson Mandela of South Africa (1999)
- Emir Isa bin Salma Al Khalifa of Bahrain
- King Hassan II of Morocco
- Emir Sabah Al-Ahmad Al-Jaber Al-Sabah of Kuwait (2009)
- President Jakaya Kikwete of Tanzania (2012)
- Crown Prince Mohammed bin Salman of Saudi Arabia (2021)
- Emir Tamim Bin Hamad Al Thani of Qatar (2021)
- King Philippe of Belgium (2022)
- King Hamad bin Issa Al Khalifa of Bahrain (2022)
- King Abdullah II bin Al-Hussein of Jordan (2022)
- President Abdel Fattah el-Sisi of Egypt (2023)
- Crown Prince Theyazin bin Haitham Al Said of Oman (2024)
- Sayyid Bilarab bin Haitham Al Said of Oman (2024)
- Queen Mathilde of Belgium (2024)
- Queen Máxima of the Netherlands (2025)
- Queen Letizia of Spain (2025)
- Narendra Modi, Prime Minister of India (2025)
- Queen Camilla of the United Kingdom (2026)

=== Second class ===
- Seishiro Eto (2021)
- Sayyid Taimur bin Asa'ad Al Said (2024)
- Sayyid Marwan bin Turki Al Said (2024)
- Sayyid Ibrahim bin Said Al Busaidi (2024)
- Dr. Hamad bin Said Al Aufi (2024)
- Dr. Khamis bin Saif Al Jabri (2024)
- Nassir bin Khamis Al Jashmi (2024)
- Salem bin Mohammed Al Mahrouqi (2024)
- Sheikh Saba bin Hamdan Al Saadi (2024)
- Abdul Salam bin Mohammed Al Marshidi (2024)
- Dr. Saud bin Hamoud Al Habsi (2024)
- Dr. Khalfan bin Saeed Al-Shuaili (2024)
- Dr. Rahma bint Ibrahim Al Mahrouqi (2024)
- Saeed bin Hamoud Al Maawali (2024)
- Dr. Saeed bin Mohammed Al Saqri (2024)
- Qais bin Mohammed Al Yousef (2024)
- Dr. Laila bint Ahmed Al Najjar (2024)
- Dr. Mahad bin Said Baawain (2024)
- Dr. Mohammed bin Nasser Al Zaabi (2024)
- Salim bin Nasser Al Aufi (2024)
- Dr. Mohammed bin Saeed Al Maamari (2024)
- Hilal bin Ali Al Sabti (2024)
- Sheikh Ghosn bin Hilal Al Alawi (2024)
