= Hilal bin Ali Al Sabti =

Oman cardiothoracic surgeon

Hilal bin Ali bin Hilal Al Sabti
- هلال بن علي بن هلال السبتي
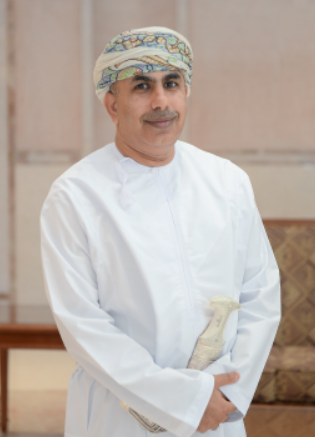
- Al Sabti in 2022

Minister of Health
- Incumbent
- Assumed office 16 June 2022
- Monarch: Haitham bin Tariq
- Prime Minister: Haitham bin Tariq
- Preceded by: Ahmed bin Mohammed bin Obaid Al Saeedi

Personal details
- Born: October 27, 1972 (age 53)
- Education: Sultan Qaboos University (Dr)

Hilal bin Ali bin Hilal Al Sabti (Arabic:هلال بن علي بن هلال السبتي; born October 27, 1972) is an Omani cardiac surgeon who is the incumbent Minister of Health of Oman since June 2022.

== Education ==
Al Sabti earned his MD degree from Sultan Qaboos University (SQU) in Muscat where he also did his residency. He completed his residency training in cardiac surgery at McGill University, Canada while obtaining a M.Sc degree in Experimental Surgery.

He obtained his Board certification in cardiac surgery from the Royal College of Physicians and Surgeons of Canada in 2005. He was also a fellow in Minimal Invasive Cardiac Surgery at Hamburg Eppendorf University Hospital, Germany.

== Career ==
Al Sabti was the Deputy Director-General for Clinical Affairs at Sultan Qaboos University Hospital (SQUH) from 2010 to 2013, where he pioneered the establishment of Cardiothoracic Surgery Division and also helped in the establishment of the first hybrid operating room in Oman at the university.

Al Sabti was the head of the Cardiothoracic Surgery Unit at Sultan Qaboos University Hospital (SQUH). In 2008, Al Sabti contributed in the first ThoraCAB (Thoracotomy Coronary Artery Bypass) procedure done in Oman and the Middle East. In 2013, a team of cardiac surgeons led by Al Sabti successfully conducted Transcatheter Aortic Valve Implantation (TAVI) procedures on four patients aged over 75 years. In 2014, the first artificial heart transplantation procedure in Oman was done by a team under Al Sabti. In April 2015, he led a team which successfully managed to perform a rare surgery, by planting a valve inside the aorta and mitral valves through a catheter. A first-of-its-kind surgery in the world done on a pregnant woman. In November 2020, Al Sabti headed a team of surgeons, who replaced three arteries in the heart of a patient suffering from a rare heart condition known as Spontaneous Coronary Artery Dissection (SCAD).

Al Sabti served as the executive president of Oman Medical Specialty Board (OMSB), from May 2015 to June 2022, where he helped establish the E-learning platform for healthcare professionals in Oman and also initiated the accreditation of local fellowship programs.

On June 16, 2022, Sultan Haitham Bin Tariq appointed him as the Minister of Health of Oman.

== Honours ==
In November 2015, Al Sabti was honoured with the Civil Order of Oman (3rd class) by Sultan Qaboos. In May 2019, he was honoured by Sultan Qaboos with GCC Medal in Civil Service and Administrative Development. Al Sabti was also conferred an honorary fellowship by the College of Anaesthesiologists of Ireland in May 2019.

Sultan Haitham bin Tariq honoured him with the Civil Order of Oman (2nd class) on 18 November 2024.
