= Alex Greenwood (disambiguation) =

Alex Greenwood (born 1993) is an English women's professional footballer.

Alex Greenwood may also refer to:

- Alex Greenwood (footballer, born 1933) (1933–2006), English footballer
- Alex Greenwood, a musician in the band Sports Team

== See also ==
- Al Greenwood (born 1951), U.S. rock musician
- Greenwood (surname)
- Greenwood (disambiguation)
- Alex (disambiguation)
