= List of titles and honours of Hassanal Bolkiah =

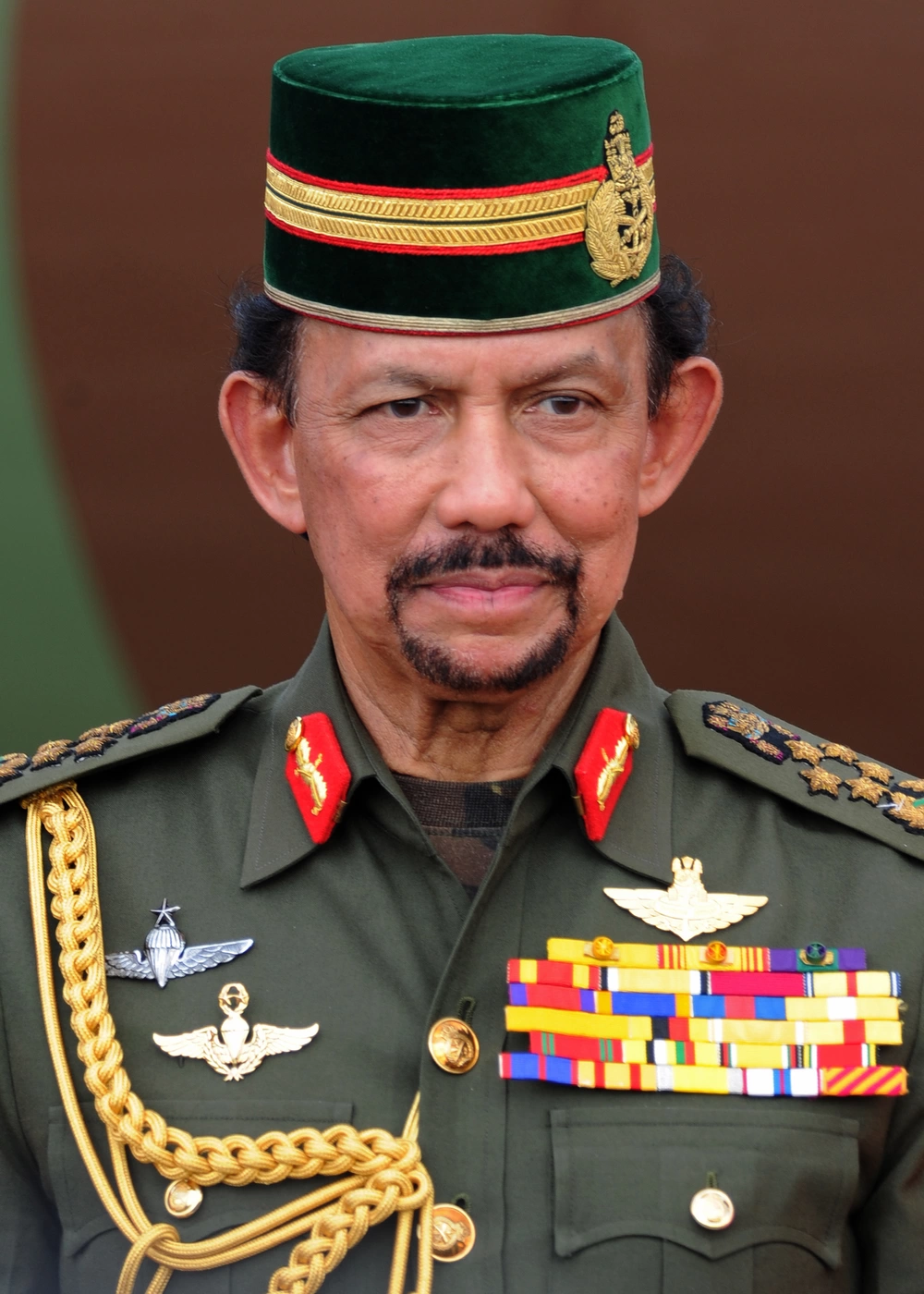
Hassanal Bolkiah at BRIDEX 2013

This is a comprehensive list of awards, honours, and recognitions received by Hassanal Bolkiah, the 29th and current Sultan of Brunei, and 1st and current Prime Minister of Brunei.

== Honours of Brunei ==
Country	Date	Appointment	Ribbon	Post-nominal letters	Ref
Brunei	15 August 1982	Royal Family Order of the Crown of Brunei		DKMB	
Brunei	24 January 1963	Royal Family Order of Laila Utama of Brunei, 1st Class		DK I	
Brunei	1 August 1968	Royal Family Order of Seri Utama of Brunei, 2nd Class		DK II	
Brunei	1 August 1968	Order of the Islam Religion of the State of Brunei, 1st Class		PSSUB	
Brunei	1 August 1968	Order of Splendid Valour, 1st Class		DPKG	
Brunei	1 August 1968	Order of Famous Valour, 1st Class		DPKT	
Brunei	1 August 1968	Order of the Hero of the State of Brunei, 1st Class		PSPNB	
Brunei	1 August 1968	Order of Loyalty to the State of Brunei, 1st Class		PSNB	
Brunei	1 August 1968	Order of Merit of Brunei, 1st Class		PSLJ	
Brunei	1 August 1968	Order of the Crown of Brunei, 1st Class		SPMB	
Brunei	1 August 1968	Order of Gallantry of the State of Brunei, 1st Class		PANB	

== Foreign honours ==
Country		Date	Appointment	Ribbon	Post-nominal letters	Reff
Bahrain		24 September 1988	Order of Khalifa			
East Timor		21 May 2024	Grand Collar of the Order of Timor-Leste			
Egypt		17 December 1984	Collar of the Order of the Nile			
France		16 December 1996	Grand Cross of the National Order of the Legion of Honour			
Germany		30 March 1998	Grand Cross Special Class of the Order of Merit of the Federal Republic of Germany			
Hungary		18 November 2025	Grand Cross with Chain of the Hungarian Order of Merit			
Indonesia		22 October 1984	First Class (Adipurna) of the Star of the Republic of Indonesia			
Japan		3 April 1984	Collar of the Supreme Order of the Chrysanthemum			
Jordan		19 December 1984	Grand Cordon of the Order of al-Hussein bin Ali			
Kuwait		18 May 2015	Collar of the Order of Mubarak the Great			
Kosovo		5 May 2025	Order of Independence			
Laos		29 November 2004	Medal of Phoxay Lane Xang			
Laos		3 October 2023	National Gold Medal			
Malaysia		9 July 1980	Honorary Recipient of the Order of the Crown of the Realm		DMN	
Malaysia		28 October 1986	Gallant Commander of the Order of Warriors of the Military Forces		PGAT	
Malaysia		30 July 2019	Recipient of the 16th Yang di-Pertuan Agong Installation Medal			
Malaysia		20 July 2024	Recipient of the 17th Yang di-Pertuan Agong Installation Medal			
Malaysia	Johor	19 September 1969	First Class of the Royal Family Order of Johor		DK I	
Malaysia	Johor	12 September 2023	First Class of the Order of Sultan Ibrahim of Johor		SMIJ	
Malaysia	Johor	23 March 2015	Recipient of Sultan Ibrahim Ismail Coronation Medal - First Class of Gold Medal			
Malaysia	Kelantan	10 July 1968	Recipient of the Royal Family Order of Kelantan		DK	
Malaysia	Kelantan	25 April 2004	Recipient of Sultan Ismail Petra Silver Jubilee Medal			
Malaysia	Kedah	1 April 2002	Member of the Royal Family Order of Kedah		DK	
Malaysia	Kedah	23 July 2008	Recipient of the Sultan Abdul Halim Golden Jubilee Medal			
Malaysia	Kedah	27 October 2018	Recipient of the Sultan Sallehuddin Installation Medal			
Malaysia	Negeri Sembilan	16 April 1981	Member of the Royal Family Order of Negeri Sembilan		DKNS	
Malaysia	Negeri Sembilan	27 October 2009	Recipient of the Tuanku Muhriz Installation Medal			
Malaysia	Pahang	19 May 1984	Member 1st class of the Family Order of the Crown of Indra of Pahang		DK I	
Malaysia	Perak	15 August 1988	Recipient of the Royal Family Order of Perak		DK	
Malaysia	Perak	14 February 2009	Recipient of the Sultan Azlan Shah Silver Jubilee Medal			
Malaysia	Perak	9 May 2015	Recipient of the Sultan Nazrin Shah Installation Medal			
Malaysia	Perlis	10 August 1988	Recipient of the Perlis Family Order of the Gallant Prince Syed Putra Jamalullail		DK	
Malaysia	Perlis	17 April 2025	Recipient of Tuanku Syed Sirajuddin Jamalullail Silver Jubilee Medal			
Malaysia	Selangor	23 November 1987	First Class of the Royal Family Order of Selangor		DK I	
Malaysia	Terengganu	4 October 1992	Member of the Supreme Royal Family Order of Terengganu		DKT	
Malaysia	Sabah	18 September 2001	Grand Commander of the Order of Kinabalu		SPDK	
Malaysia	Sarawak	9 March 1989	Knight Grand Commander of the Most Exalted Order of the Star of Sarawak		DUBS	
Morocco		16 September 1988	Collar of the Order of Muhammad			
Netherlands		21 January 2013	Knight Grand Cross of the Order of the Netherlands Lion			
Oman		3 November 2026	The Order of Al Said			
Oman		15 December 1984	The Civil Order of Oman, First Class			
Pakistan		18 September 1992	Nishan-e-Pakistan		NPk	
Peru		12 November 2024	Grand Collar of the Order of the Sun of Peru			
Philippines		29 August 1988	Grand Collar of the Order of Sikatuna		GCS	
Philippines		5 March 1998	Chief Commander of the Philippine Legion of Honor		CCLH	
Philippines		30 January 2009	Grand Collar of the Order of Lakandula			
Saudi Arabia		3 January 1999	Collar of the Order of Badr Chain			
Singapore		12 February 1990	First class of the Order of Temasek		DUT	
Singapore		12 February 1990	Military Distinguished Service Order		DUBC	
South Korea		6 April 1984	Grand Order of Mugunghwa			
Sweden		7 February 2004	Knight of the Royal Order of the Seraphim		RSerafO	
Thailand		1 November 1988	Knight of the Order of Rajamitrabhorn		KRM	
Ukraine		8 March 2004	Order of Prince Yaroslav the Wise 1st Class			
Ukraine		27 January 2007	Order of Danylo Halytsky			
United Kingdom		1 August 1968	Honorary Companion of the Most Distinguished Order of St Michael and St George		CMG	
United Kingdom		29 February 1972	Honorary Knight Grand Cross of the Most Distinguished Order of St Michael and St George		GCMG	
United Kingdom		4 November 1992	Honorary Knight Grand Cross of the Most Honourable Order of the Bath		GCB	
United Kingdom		6 February 2012	Queen Elizabeth II Diamond Jubilee Medal			
United Kingdom		6 February 2022	Queen Elizabeth II Platinum Jubilee Medal			

== Military rank ==
- Honorary Admiral in the Royal Navy
- Honorary General in the British Army
- Honorary Air Chief Marshal in the Royal Air Force

== Honorary degrees ==
- Brunei:
  - Honorary Litt.D. degree from the Universiti Brunei Darussalam (21 September 1989)
  - Honorary Ph.D. degree in Engineering from the Universiti Teknologi Brunei (30 September 2017)
- China:
  - Honorary Ph.D. degree in International Relations from Beijing Foreign Studies University (20 October 2001)
- Indonesia:
  - Honorary doctorate of Humanities and Culture from Gadjah Mada University
  - Honorary doctorate of Philosophy and Humanities from the University of Indonesia (21 April 2011)
- Malaysia:
  - Honorary Ph.D. degree in Political Science from the International Islamic University Malaysia (2 October 2001)
  - Honorary LL.D. degree from Universiti Sains Malaysia (5 November 2014)
  - Honorary doctorate (Islamic Leadership) from the MARA University of Technology (23 March 2019)
- Russia:
  - Honorary doctorate from Moscow State Institute of International Relations (2005)
- Scotland:
  - Honorary Litt.D. degree from the University of Aberdeen (1995)
- Singapore:
  - Honorary LL.D. degree from National University of Singapore (27 January 2005)
- Thailand:
  - Honorary Doctor of Political Science from Chulalongkorn University (28 August 2002)
- United Kingdom:
  - Honorary LL.D. degree from King's College London (2011)
  - Honorary D.C.L. degree from the University of Oxford (1993)
