= Culyer =

Culyer is a surname. Notable people with the surname include:

- Anthony J. Culyer (born 1942), British economist
- John Y. Culyer (1839–1924), American civil engineer, landscape architect, and architect

== See also ==
- Culver (surname)
- Cuyler
