= John H. Sharp =

American lawyer and judge (1874–1957)

Justice of the Supreme Court of Texas
- In office December 1934 – December 31, 1952
- Preceded by: Thomas B. Greenwood
- Succeeded by: Frank P. Culver Jr.

Personal details
- Born: John Henry Sharp; April 25, 1874 Nesbitt, Texas, US
- Died: November 20, 1957 (aged 83) Austin, Texas, US
- Party: Democratic
- Children: 2
- Education: Southwestern University
- Occupation: Lawyer, judge

John Henry Sharp (April 25, 1874 – November 20, 1957) was an American lawyer and judge. A Democrat, he served as a Justice of the Supreme Court of Texas from 1934 to 1952.

== Biography ==
Sharp was born on April 25, 1874, on a farm near Nesbitt, Texas. His father was Andrew Jackson Sharp, a gunner who fought in the Battle of Hampton Roads, and his mother was Mollie (née Brown) Sharp; his parents had eight other children. From 1893 to 1897, he studied at Southwestern University, graduating with a Bachelor of Arts; he earned an honorary Doctor of Civil Law in 1951. He studied law in Franklin, being admitted to the bar in 1898. In 1900, he began practicing law, in Ennis, and was a trial lawyer.

Sharp was a Democrat. He was mayor of Ennis for one term and was the president of its school board for a long period of time. On October 7, 1929, he was appointed a judge of the Texas Court of Criminal Appeals by Governor Dan Moody to fill a vacancy. In December 1934, he was appointed an Associate Justice of the Supreme Court of Texas by Governor Miriam A. Ferguson. Over his career, he wrote 512 Supreme Court opinions. He retired on December 31, 1952.

Sharp was a Baptist and a Freemason. On June 6, 1906, he married Eula King; they had two children together. He owned hundreds of acres of land in Navarro County. He was a member of the Rotary club, and in 1929, won a door prize at a luncheon. He died on November 20, 1957, aged 83, in Austin. He was buried at the Texas State Cemetery, in the Supreme Court section.

Political offices
Preceded by Thomas B. Greenwood	Justice of the Texas Supreme Court; 1934–1952	Succeeded by Court reorganized
