= Order of Friendship (North Korea) =

State order awarded by the government of North Korea

Awarded by the Democratic People's Republic of Korea
- Type: State order
- Established: 25 July 1985
- Country: North Korea
- Eligibility: Foreigners
- Criteria: International friendship

- Order of Friendship
- Chosŏn'gŭl: 친선훈장
- Hancha: 親善勳章
- Revised Romanization: Chinseon hunjang
- McCune–Reischauer: Ch'insŏn hunjang

The Order of Friendship (Korean: 친선훈장) is a state order awarded by the government of North Korea. It is restricted only to non-nationals. The order has two classes.

The order was established on 25 July 1985.

== Recipients ==
=== First Class ===
Recipient	Date	Citizenship	Ref
Timo Ravela	1986	Finland	
Sakari Knuuttila	1986	Finland	
Anna-Liisa Jokinen	1986	Finland	
Hifikepunye Pohamba	20 March 2008	Namibia	
Liu Xiaoming	3 February 2010	China	
Antonio Inoki	September 2010	Japan	
German Hermin Ferras Alvarez	18 November 2015	Cuba	
Aleksandr Matsegora	23 November 2015	Russia	
Johnny Hon	2007	Hong Kong	
Neil Jurgen Fitzgerald		Australia	
Jozef Servista	7 August 2017	Czech Republic	
Li Jinjun	23 December 2021	China	

=== Second Class ===
Recipient	Date	Citizenship	Ref
Ensio Laine	1986	Finland	
Matti Salminen	1986	Finland	
Masako Yamashita	2 May 1997	Japan	
Jan Langer	1988	Czechoslovakia	
Ellsworth Culver	10 January 2006	United States	
Norbert Vollertsen	1999	Germany	
Alejandro Cao de Benos	Unknown	Spain	
Nataša Weberová		Czech Republic	
Tony Michell		United Kingdom	
Pekka Leppänen	5 September 2015	Finland	
Dermot Hudson	15 August 2017	United Kingdom	
Neil Jurgen Fitzgerald		Australia	
Lukáš Vrobel	14 April 2019	Czech Republic	
Miguel Alba	4 May 1994	Mexico	
Mario Bogdanov	2024	Bulgaria	
Michael Prewett	2024	United Kingdom	

== See also ==
- Orders, decorations, and medals of North Korea
