= Ministry of Agriculture, Fisheries and Water Resources =

Coordinates: 23°35′54″N 58°25′39″E

Sultanate of Oman Ministry of Agriculture, Fisheries and Water Resources
- وزارة الثروة الزراعية والسمكية وموارد المياه
- National emblem of Oman

Agency overview
- Jurisdiction: Government of Oman
- Headquarters: Muscat (Oman)
- Agency executive: Saud bin Hamoud bin Ahmed Al Habsi, Minister
- Website: Official website

The Ministry of Agriculture, Fisheries and Water Resources is the governmental body in the Sultanate of Oman responsible for all matters relating to agriculture, fisheries and water resources. On 18 August 2020, the Ministry of Agriculture and Fisheries was renamed the Ministry of Agriculture, Fisheries and Water Resources as part of a wider restructuring of the Omani government.

== History ==
The Ministry of Agriculture, Fisheries, Petroleum and Minerals was established in 1974. In 1979, the Ministry of Agriculture and Fisheries was formed from this ministry. Subsequently, in 1992, the ministry was renamed the Ministry of Agriculture and Fisheries Wealth. The Ministry of Agriculture and Fisheries was divided into two separate ministries, the Ministry of Agriculture and the Ministry of Fisheries, in 2007. The two ministries were reunited in March 2011, however, as part of a cabinet reshuffle under Sultan Qaboos bin Said.

On 18 August 2020, as part of a government reorganisation, Sultan Haitham bin Tariq renamed it the Ministry of Agriculture, Fisheries and Water Resources. The ministry also assumed the responsibilities of the water resources divisions, the Food Safety and Quality Centre, and the defunct Public Authority for Stores and Food Reserves.

== Responsibilities ==
The ministry is responsible for developing policies and legislation relating to agriculture, livestock, fisheries, water resources, and food security. It promotes agricultural development, prevents disease, improves the efficiency of irrigation systems, manages fisheries sustainably, develops aquaculture, and ensures food safety. The ministry also manages fishing ports. It also oversees strategic food reserves, water conservation, research, training and international cooperation. According to Royal Decree 131/2020, the ministry is responsible for proposing policies and plans relating to the water and wastewater sectors. Meanwhile, the Authority for Public Services Regulation is responsible for regulatory oversight.
