= Oman Medical Journal =

- Discipline: Medicine
- Language: English
- Edited by: Ibrahim Al-Zakwani

Publication details
- History: 1984-present
- Publisher: Oman Medical Specialty Board (Oman)
- Frequency: Bimonthly
- Open access: Yes

Standard abbreviations
- ISO 4: Oman Med. J.

Indexing
- ISSN: 1999-768X (print); 2070-5204 (web)
- OCLC no.: 762001337

Links
- Journal homepage

The Oman Medical Journal is a bimonthly open access peer-reviewed medical journal. It was established in 1984 and published by the Oman Medical Specialty Board. At the start of 2020, Oman Medical Journal transitioned from a print-publication to an electronic-only publication.

== Content ==
The journal publishes different types of articles from various medical disciplines:

- Editorial
- Review article
- Original article
- Case report
- Brief communications
- Clinical quiz
- Clinical notes
- Letters to the Editor

== Continuing medical education credits ==
The Oman Medical Specialty Board awards continuing medical education credits to authors and reviewers of the Oman Medical Journal.

== Abstracting and indexing ==
The journal is listed in PubMed and PubMed Central, and indexed in Index Medicus for the Eastern Mediterranean Region, Google Scholar, CrossRef, Index Copernicus, CINAHL, DOAJ, Global Health, Academic OneFile, Academic Science in Context, Academic Journals Database, CAB Abstracts, CABI Publishing, Chemical Abstracts, Cornell University Library, EBSCO Publishing Electronic Database, Embase, Electronic Journals Library (EZB), Expanded Academic ASAP, Genamics JournalSeek, Gale and Open J-Gate, GFMER, Health Reference Center, ICMJE, Newjour, SCIRUS, SCImago Journal & Country Rank, Scopus, Summon by Serial Solution, The John Rylands Library, and UlrichsWeb Directory.
