= Mahad Said Baawain =

Omani politician

Mahad bin Said bin Ali Baawain
- محاد بن سعيد بن علي باعوين
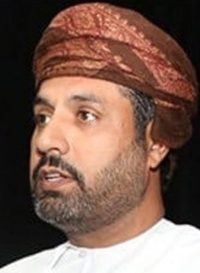

Minister of Labour
- Incumbent
- Assumed office 18 August 2020
- Monarch: Haitham bin Tariq
- Prime Minister: Haitham bin Tariq

Personal details
- Education: University of Alberta (PhD)

Mahad bin Said bin Ali Baawain (Arabic: محاد بن سعيد بن علي باعوين) is the Omani Minister of Labour. He was appointed as minister on 18 August 2020.

== Education ==
Bawaain holds a bachelor's degree in civil engineering from the Sultan Qaboos University (1998), a master's degree in environmental engineering from the Imperial College (2000) and a PhD from the University of Alberta (2007).

== Career ==
From 2002 until 2007, Baawain was research assistant at the University of Alberta. In 2007, he was appointed assistant professor and in 2013 associate professor at Sultan Qaboos University. Additionally, he was managing director at the Centre for Environmental Studies and Research (CEASAR) from 2013 until 2016.

In June 2020, he was appointed dean of the college and Full Professor at the International Maritime College Oman.

On 18 August 2020, Baawain was appointed minister of labour.

== Honors ==
=== Nacional honors ===
- Oman:
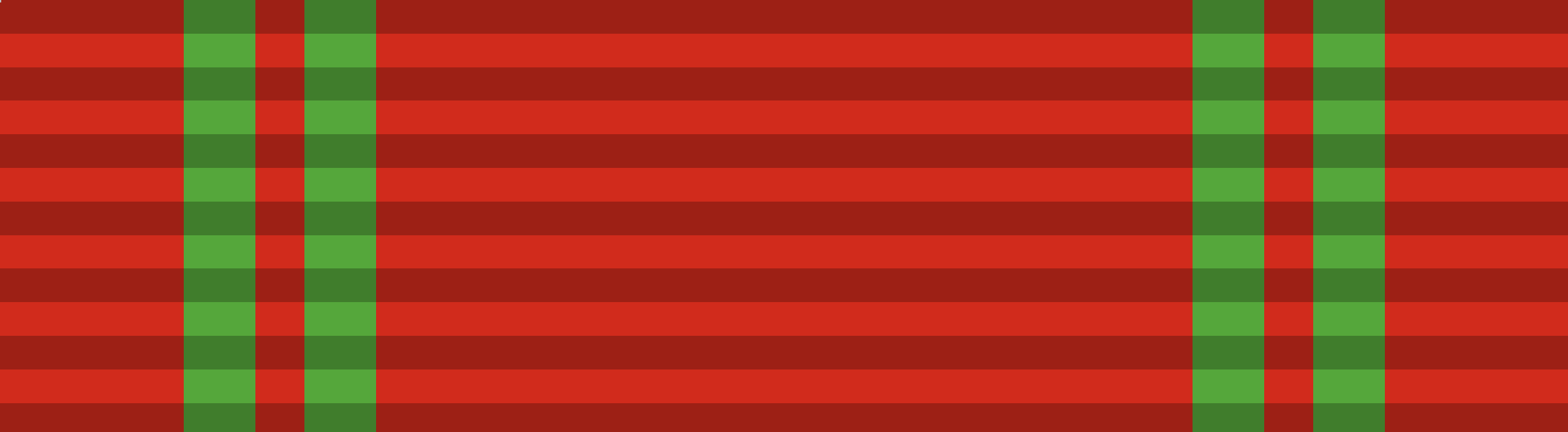
  - Second Class of the Civil Order of Oman (18 November 2024).
