= Johnny Hon =

Hong Kong businessman

- 韓世灝
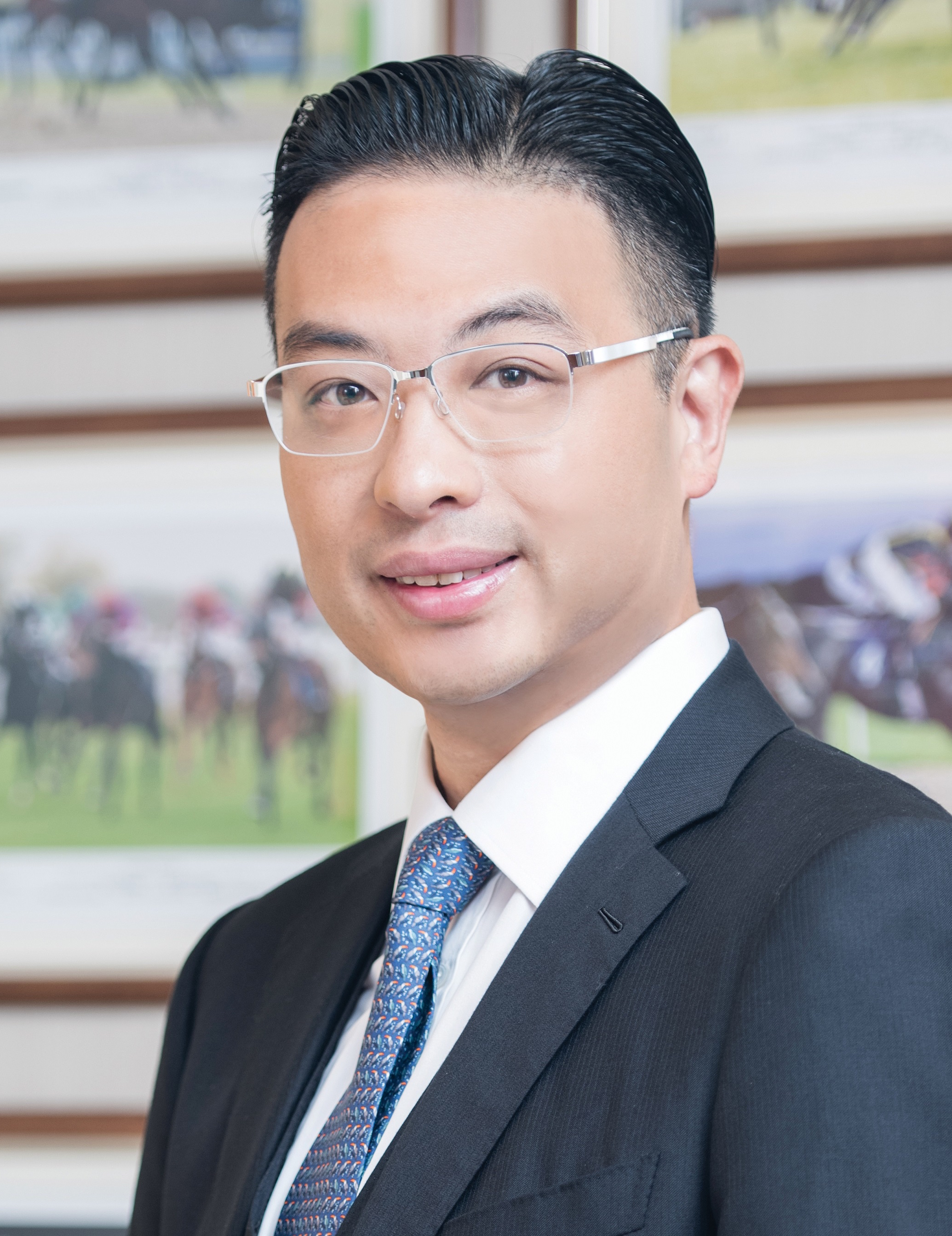

Personal details
- Born: 22 December 1971 (age 54)
- Children: 5
- Education: St. Paul's Co-educational College; Uppingham School
- Alma mater: King's College London (BSc); Hughes Hall, Cambridge (PhD); SOAS, University of London (M.A.); Harvard Business School (Executive education); Peking University; Massachusetts Institute of Technology
- Profession: Entrepreneur
- Awards: Knight of the Order of the Star of Anjouan (Comoros); Order of Friendship (North Korea); Medal of Honour (Hong Kong); Medal of Honor, The Sovereign Hospitaller Order of Saint John of Jerusalem (Knights of Malta); All Ukrainian Union Medal for the Rebuilding of Ukraine
- Website: www.johnnyhon.com

Chinese name
- Traditional Chinese: 韓世灝
- Simplified Chinese: 韩世灏
Transcriptions

Johnny Sei-Hoe Hon (born 22 December 1971) is a Hong Kong businessman and politician. He is the founder of the Global Group, which he established after working at ABN AMRO Bank in Hong Kong. He is most known for his media ventures and work as an executive producer in the film and television industry, as well as live theater.

== Early life and education ==
Johnny Hon was born in Hong Kong on 22 December 1971 to Hon Tak Sun, and Wong Ling (Betty). He is the eldest of their two sons. Hon now has four daughters and one son. At age 13, Hon left Hong Kong to study at Uppingham School in the United Kingdom. In 1990, he went on to attend King's College London and graduated in 1993. Hon then attended Hughes Hall, Cambridge where he obtained his PhD in Psychiatry. He also holds an M.A. degree in Korean Studies studied at The School of Oriental & African Studies.

== Career ==
After obtaining his PhD, Hon began his career in the private banking sector at ABN AMRO Bank in Hong Kong. He left private banking in 1997 and established Global Group International Holdings Ltd., which developed into an international venture capital company involved in banking, biotechnology, education, entertainment, leisure, financial services, financial technology, gaming, media, mining, oil and gas, property development and sports.

Global Group's media and entertainment investments include a number of international projects such as W, a biographical drama produced by Oliver Stone that explored the life and presidency of George W. Bush. He was also executive producer of the film Fagara written and directed by Heiward Mak, Protégé produced by Derek Yee, and the TV drama series in China, Da Ren Wu (2006–07).

Hon is also involved in the theatre business, and worked as executive producer with Michael Linnit and Michael Grade on the revival of Sunset Boulevard starring Glenn Close. He was also executive producer of the West End musical, 42nd Street (musical).

Hon has investments in fine art, wine collection, and horse racing. He has recently hired French jockey, Gerald Mossé, as his principal rider for his stable of over 40 horses in the United Kingdom and internationally.

== Philanthropy ==
The Global Group is a sponsor of educational funds and scholarships in both China and UK, including for University of Oxford and Peking University. The educational scholarships were created to open up opportunities for Chinese students. In July 2015, Hon was awarded the Medal of Honour from the Government of Hong Kong SAR for his contributions to the Lok Sin Tong Benevolent Society, Kowloon.

In early 2018, Hon donated to the New Countryside Construction Project in Xiaping Village, which is located in Yunfu City within China's Guangdong Province. The construction project increased government investment in agriculture, expanding rural areas and the fiscal coverage of rural areas and infrastructure.

== Politics ==
Hon has involvement in a range of diplomatic and political projects. He holds official positions within four governments.

=== Armenia ===
In 2012, Hon was appointed adviser to the Minister of Economy of Armenia.

=== China ===
Hon is a member of the 12th Heilongjiang Provincial Standing Committee, Chinese People's Political Consultative Conference (CPPCC). He is a former Member of the 10th Heilongjiang Provincial CPPCC, the 11th Heilongjiang Provincial CPPCC, and a former Member of the 6th Yunfu Municipal Committee, CPPCC as well the 5th Yunfu Municipal Committee, CPPCC.

Further, Hon is an Economic Adviser for a number of local governments within China, including the People's Government of Jilin Province and the People's Government of Yuyao City in Zhejiang Province.

=== Grenada ===
Hon served two terms as the Honorary Consul of Grenada in Hong Kong and the country's Ambassador-at-large.

=== Hong Kong SAR (China) ===
Hon was previously a member of the Central Committee of the New People's Party New People's Party (NPP) and was involved from the time it was established by Regina Ip Lau Suk-yee GBS JP in 2011, he also held the role of Vice Chairman of the Party from January 2019 to June 2023.

=== North Korea ===
In 2007, Hon said, “No prize in the world is as prestigious as the ‘International Kim Il Sung Prize. As chairman of the International Kim Il Sung Foundation, I will make every possible effort to carry out the noble cause started by the President, deeply aware of the mission I have assumed before the times and humankind.’” The International Kim Il Sung Prize is an award conferred for contributions to the study and dissemination of the Juche idea.

=== Saint Vincent and the Grenadines ===
In 2002, Hon was the Commercial Representative for Saint Vincent and the Grenadines in Hong Kong and Singapore.

== Arms ==
Hon was granted arms by the Lord Lyon Court in 2018.

Coat of arms of Johnny Hon
Crest A demi-Chinese dragon Or langued Gules holding in its dexter paw an hour-glass Proper. Escutcheon Sable on a fess Or between two Chinese swords saltireways points upwards proper hilted and pommelled of the Second in chief and an ancient crown of the Second in base a horse in full gallop of the First. Motto Ambition Perseverance Success

== Publications ==
- Hon, J., Huppert, F.A., Holland, A.J. and Watson, P. (1998) The value of the Rivermead Behavioural Memory Test (Children's Version) in an epidemiological study of adults with Down's syndrome. British Journal of Clinical Psychology, 37: 15–29
- Holland, A.J., Hon, J., Huppert, F.A., Stevens, F. and Watson, P. (1998) A population-based study of the prevalence and presentation of dementia in adults with Down's syndrome. British Journal of Psychiatry, 172: 493–498
- Hon, J., Holland, A.J., Huppert, F.A. and Watson, P. (1999) Neuropsychological assessment of older adults with Down's syndrome: an epidemiological study using the Cambridge Cognitive Examination (CAMCOG). British Journal of Clinical Psychology, 38: 155–165
- Rubinzstein, D., Hon, J., Stevens, F., Pyrah, L., Tysoe, C., Huppert, F.A., Easton, D.F. and Holland, A.J. (1999) ApoE genotype and risk of dementia in Down's syndrome. Neuropsychiatric Genetics, 88B (4): 344–347
- Holland, A.J., Hon, J., Huppert, F.A., Stevens, F. and Watson, P. (2000) The incidence and course of dementia in people with Down's syndrome: Findings from a population-based study. Journal of Intellectual Disability Research, 44 (2): 138–146
- Ball, S.L., Holland, A.J., Huppert, F.A., Treppner, P., Watson, P. and Hon, J. (2004) The modified CAMDEX informant interview is a valid and reliable tool for use in the diagnosis of dementia in adults with Down's syndrome. Journal of Intellectual Disability Research, 48 (6): 611–620
- Ball, S.L., Holland, A.J., Hon, J., Huppert, F.A., Treppner, P. and Watson, P. (2006) Personality and behaviour changes mark the early stages of Alzheimer's disease in adults with Down's syndrome: findings from a prospective population-based study. International Journal of Geriatric Psychiatry, 21 (7): 661–673
- Landt, J., Ball, S.L., Holland, A.J., Hon, J., Owen, A., Treppner, P. and Herbert, J. (2011) Age-Related Changes in Plasma Dehydroepiandrosterone Levels in Adults with Down's Syndrome and the Risk of Dementia. Journal of Neuroendocrinology, 23 (5): 450–455
