= Saud bin Hamoud bin Ahmed Al Habsi =

Oman politician

- سعود بن حمود بن أحمد الحبسي
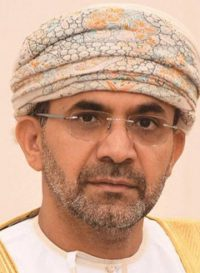

Minister of Agricultural, Fisheries and Water Resources
- Incumbent
- Assumed office 18 August 2020
- Monarch: Haitham bin Tariq
- Prime Minister: Haitham bin Tariq
- Preceded by: Hamad bin Said bin Sulaiman Al Aufi

Personal details
- Education: Newcastle University (PhD)

Saud bin Hamoud bin Ahmed Al Habsi (Arabic: سعود بن حمود بن أحمد الحبسي) is the Omani Minister of Agricultural, Fisheries and Water Resources. He was appointed as minister on 18 August 2020.

== Education ==
Al Habsi holds a PhD from Newcastle University.

== Career ==
Al Habsi previously worked at the Directorate of Fisheries research of the Omani Ministry of Agriculture and Fisheries, and in 2013, he was appointed Director of the Environmental and Bioresources Sector of the Research Council of Oman.

In 2016, he worked at the Oman Aquaculture Development Company. Al Habsi was also the Undersecretary for Fish Resources.

Since 18 August 2020, Al Habsi has been Minister of Agricultural, Fisheries and Water Resources.

== Honors ==
=== National honors ===
- Oman:
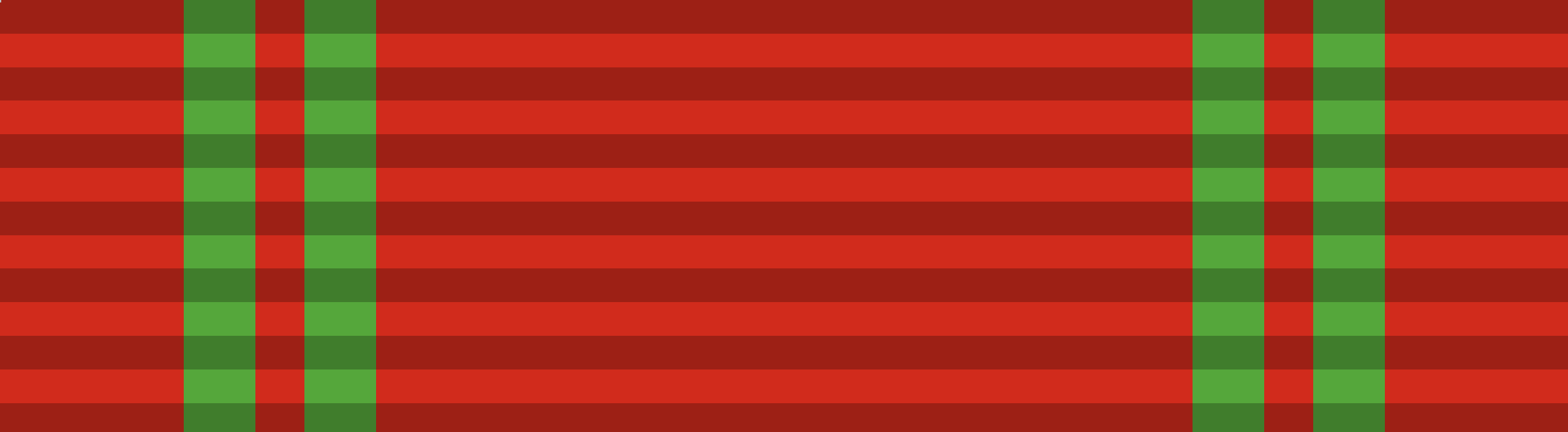
  - Second Class of the Civil Order of Oman (18 November 2024).
