= Mercy Corps =

American humanitarian aid NGO founded 1979

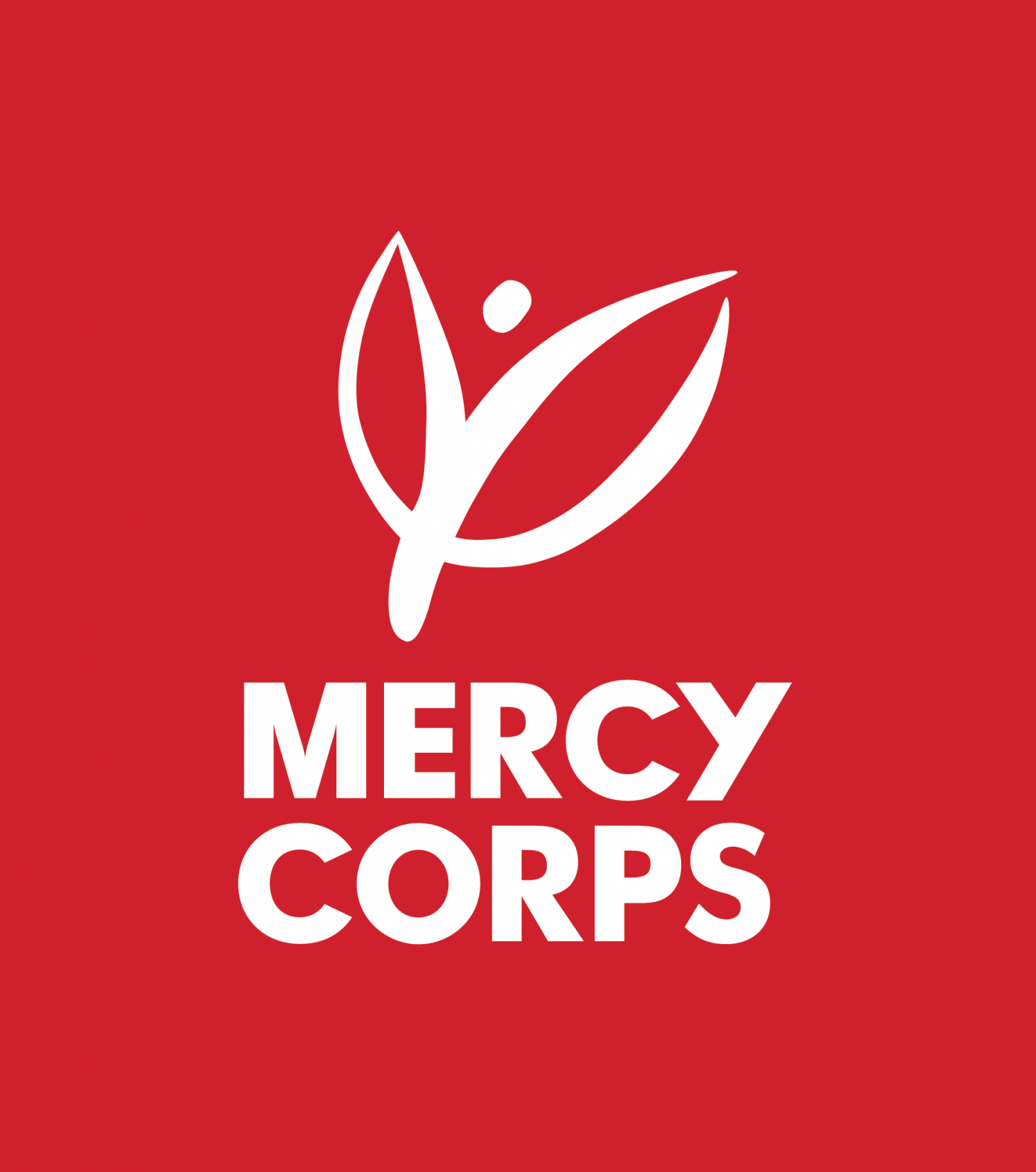
- Founded: November 1979; 47 years ago (as Save the Refugees Fund)
- Founders: Dan O'Neill & Ellsworth Culver
- Type: Non-Profit Organization; 501(c)(3)
- Headquarters: Portland, Oregon, U.S.
- Board of directors: Kito de Boer; Vijaya Gaddtsion; Lesley Ndlovu; Stanley Wanyoike Njoroge; Kendi Ntwiga; Farah Pandith; Paul Y. Song; Ludovic Subran; Kofi Taha; Thierry Tanoh; Rebecca ("Becca") Van Dyck; Pepijn van Dijk
- Key people: Tjada D'Oyen McKenna
- Revenue: US$ 488,000,000 (2023)
- Expenses: US$ 434,817,000 (2016)
- Staff: 6,000
- Website: www.mercycorps.org

Mercy Corps is a global non-governmental, humanitarian aid organization operating in transitional contexts that have undergone, or have been undergoing, various forms of economic, environmental, social and political instabilities. The organization claims to have assisted more than 220 million people survive humanitarian conflicts, seek improvements in livelihoods, and deliver durable development to their communities.

Mercy Corps proposes a mission to "alleviate suffering, poverty and oppression by helping people build secure, productive and just communities." As of August 2021, the organization reports to be operating within 38 countries, including Afghanistan, Central African Republic, Myanmar and Yemen, with programs focused in a number of humanitarian sectors ranging from conflict management, children & youth to agriculture and food security.

== History ==
Originally established as the Save the Refugee Fund in 1979 to provide first hand post-conflict relief after the Cambodian genocide under the Pol Pot regime, the organization has since expanded its mandate to deliver humanitarian assistance. In 1982, the organization's founders, Ellsworth Culver and Dan O'Neill, chose the name of Mercy Corps to represent the broader international activities of the organization that has since been focusing on delivering durable, long-term solutions to a range of humanitarian and development issues. The organization has been present in varying locations at different times – cumulatively, it reports to have delivered humanitarian assistance in 122 countries.

Mercy Corps delivered its first development program in Honduras in 1982. The program led to the establishment of the non-profit organization Project Global Village/Proyecto Aldea Global (PAG) in 1984 with a number of initiatives focused on development issues such as "health & HIV/AIDS prevention, domestic violence, education, agro-industrial development, microcredits, environmental development & infrastructure." In the next decade following the formation of Mercy Corps, the organization would gradually expand its mandates into the broader international arena, stationing in countries including Afghanistan, Ethiopia, Jordan, Bosnia, Kosovo, North Korea, North Macedonia, China, Sudan, Democratic Republic of the Congo, and Haiti.

Mercy Corps incorporated the Conflict Management Group founded by Roger Fisher in 2004. Three years later, it also moved to incorporate NetAid seeking to broaden its scope of youth engagement in fighting global poverty.

Its programs have gradually gained structural and facilitating consistency throughout the course of the organization's development, ranging from long-term market system development programs, such as the Resilient Communities Program in Mongolia that would last until 2019, to short-term emergency response programs, such as the organization's post-disaster relief initiatives in Puerto-Rico after Hurricane Maria in the months following September 2017.

In April 2025, Oregon Public Broadcasting reported that cuts to the United States Agency for International Development (USAID) by the second Donald Trump administration had forced the Mercy Corp to end "more than 2/3" of its federally-funded international aid programs.

In summer 2026, Mercy Corps announced the organization's transition to a new name and brand identity. Beginning in September 2026, Mercy Corps will be known as Prosper Global. The organization said they will make this change to move away from "religious, savior-oriented, and militaristic connotations" of their former name.

== Scandal ==
According to Ellsworth Culver's daughter, Tania Culver Humphrey, Culver sexually abused her from her early childhood until she was a teenager. Humphrey said that despite her repeatedly bringing the issue to the attention of Mercy Corps senior leadership, no action was taken beside moving Culver to another position in the organization. Following a 2019 documentary on the sexual abuse allegations released by the Oregonian, the leader of Mercy Corps, Neal Keny Guyer, as well as senior legal counsel, and a longtime board member resigned. Beth deHamel served as interim CEO and was succeeded by Tjada D'Oyen McKenna on 15 October 2020.

Following the initial media revelations, Mercy Corps commissioned an independent investigation by Freeh Group International Solutions to examine the full scope of the abuse and the 1990s board response. Published in May 2021, the 31-page Freeh Group report substantiated Humphrey's allegations, finding that past leadership had intentionally protected Culver's reputation over victim rights, ignored early disclosures, and allowed Culver to remain in senior roles until 2005. The report further disclosed that eight individuals historically affiliated with the charity, including Culver, may have sexually abused up to six children during the 1980s, prompting Mercy Corps to turn its findings over to the FBI, though Humphrey later stated in legal filings that the FBI never contacted her.

In September 2022, Humphrey filed a lawsuit against Mercy Corps in Oregon state court, seeking $1 in nominal damages and up to $54 million in punitive damages for intentional infliction of emotional distress. The lawsuit alleged that the organization's independent investigation subjected her to approximately 100 hours of grueling, adversarial interrogations without legal, therapeutic, or advocate support. Mercy Corps moved to dismiss the lawsuit, but an Oregon circuit court judge denied the motion in February 2023, allowing the case to proceed. In May 2024, Humphrey and Mercy Corps reached an out-of-court settlement, and the lawsuit was dismissed with prejudice under undisclosed terms.

== Broad philanthropic strategies ==
Throughout the course of Mercy Corps' history in its deliverance of humanitarian programs, the organization's focus in its overall operational strategies has seen substantial shifts. Starting as a non-government humanitarian aid organization specifically focused in the immediate humanitarian complexity of the refugee dilemma caused by the Cambodian genocide in 1979, the preceding incarnation of the organization, Save the Refugee Fund, focused on providing the means necessary to respond to first-hand emergencies of the grim implications of the genocide: short-term aids in food, water, shelter and other corresponding refugee assistance.

As Mercy Corps expanded its mandates and progressed into a large humanitarian aid organization with a notable international presence, it has also gradually transformed its main philanthropic focus from solely the deliverance of temporary assistance that contribute short-term impacts to the development of broader socio-economic infrastructures that encourage long-term improvements in the well-being of target beneficiaries. In a nutshell, Mercy Corps programs' main focus has transitioned from direct deliverance of emergency aid to long-term provision of assistance in improving community "resilience". Through a presentation published by USAID, Mercy Corps defines "resilience" as: "The capacity of communities in complex socio-ecological systems to learn, cope, adapt, and transform in the face of shocks and stresses."

To upkeep its new humanitarian focus on long-term community development, the phrase "Market System Development" has become one of the operational concepts of increasing importance for recent and upcoming Mercy Corps programs. Instead of focusing solely upon assisting one type of stakeholder within a community, the organization has dedicated increasing effort into engaging and all related actors and stakeholders in the complete market chain to participate in the improvement of the overall health of the targeted economic sector (agriculture, IT, pasture etc.) to eventually create a self-reliable operational market structure. Darius Radcliffe, the Country Director of Mercy Corps in Jordan, stated on 26 September 2023, that the organization will enhance diverse, dynamic economic opportunities that foster sustainable and comprehensive growth in Jordan while also improving water and energy management practices.

== Mercy Corps International ==
Mercy Corps International is the organization's main branch of operation. It focuses on resolving humanitarian and development challenges currently faced by societies in countries of unstable, transitional backgrounds. Mercy Corps International is commonly considered to be a leading organization in its field, contributing "close to 94 percent of its resources to the most vulnerable areas in the world." With primary focuses on disaster relief and capacity building, the organization has also been integrating long-term civil society and human rights initiatives into their humanitarian programs, delivering notable funds and resources to target states of operation. The organization has been gradually expanding its general mandates, and they mainly revolve around 14 main objectives:

=== Main operational objectives ===
Agriculture	Children & Youth	Conflict Management	Disaster Preparedness
Economic Opportunity	Education	Emergency Response	Environment
Food Security	Health	Innovation	Partnerships
Water	Women & Gender		

In 38 countries ranging from the Democratic Republic Congo, Haiti and Guatemala to Tajikistan, Afghanistan and Mongolia, Mercy Corps reportedly designs and delivers both temporary and long-term humanitarian assistance programs that are predominantly funded by other partnering international donor institutions. Some of the partnering donors include:

=== Partnering donor institutions ===
Mercy Corps accepts contributions from both individual and institutional donors. For instance, the organization received a combined operational grant of more than US$13 million from the United States Agency for International Development's 2016 Emergency Food Security Program in post-Ebola recovery in Liberia and conflict response in Yemen.

Governmental and Government-led Institutions: Agence Française de Développement; British Council; Danish International Development Agency (DANIDA); United Kingdom Department for International Development (DFID); Dutch Ministry of Foreign Affairs; United Kingdom Foreign & Commonwealth Office (FCO); Government of the Netherlands; Financial Sector Deepening (FSD) Africa; Ministry for Communities and Return (MCR) Kosovo; PROPARCO; Norwegian Ministry of Foreign Affairs; Government of Scotland; United States Agency for International Development (USAID); Swedish Agency for International Development Cooperation (SIDA); Swiss Agency for Development and Cooperation (SDC)	International and Regional Organizations: European Commission (EC); GRM International; Nordic International Support Foundation (NIS); Refugees International Japan; Technical Centre for Agricultural and Rural Cooperation (CTA); United Nations (UN); United Nations Office for the Coordination of Humanitarian Affairs (UNOCHA); United Nations Children's Fund (UNICEF); United Nations Food and Agriculture Organization (FAO); United Nations Development Programme (UNDP)	Non-Government, Private and Charity Institutions: Adam Smith International; Afghanistan Research and Evaluation Unit (AREU); Diakonie Katastrophenhilfe; European Humanitarian Aid and Civil Protection (ECHO); Hivos (Humanist Institute for Cooperation); Initiative France; Livelihoods and Food Security Trust Fund; Silatech; World Vision International; The Coca-Cola Foundation; Google; Bill and Melinda Gates Foundation

== Mercy Corps Northwest ==
Mercy Corps Northwest operates domestically within the United States with focuses in primary economic development. It mainly aims to stimulate business growth opportunities for individuals and communities in the states of Oregon and Washington. Through different community development programs, Mercy Corps Northwest seeks to offer financial and technical assistance to low-income individuals to start a business, or small local business owners who experience financial hardships to overcome particular challenges, with the ultimate end-goal to enhance community-level economic capacity. Some of the specific target populations include (but not restricted to):

- New college graduates;
- Retirees;
- Low-income families;
- Female small business owners;
- Former prisoners seeking community reentry.

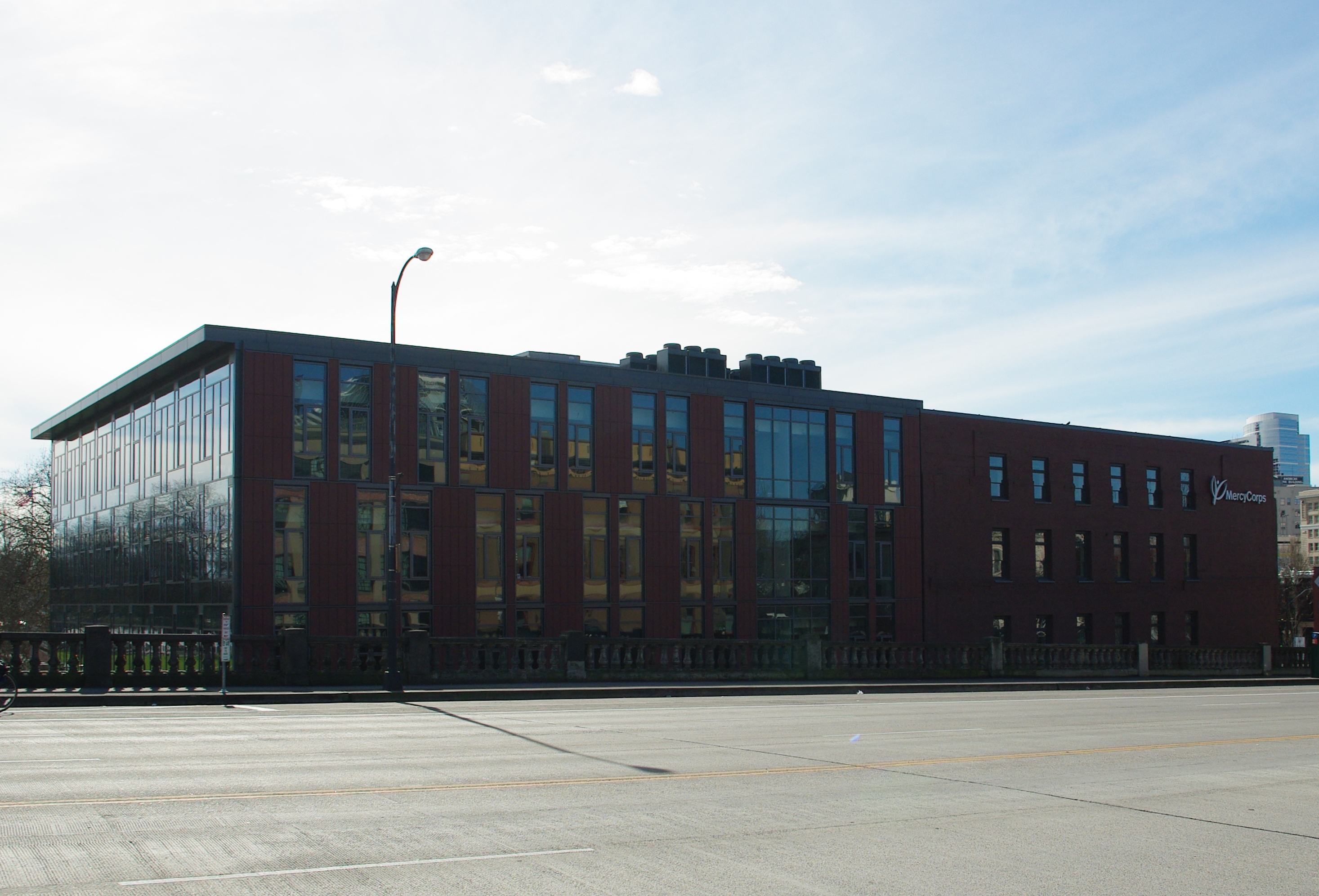
Mercy Corps' headquarters building in Portland, Oregon

Mercy Corps Northwest targets several social fronts through a number of programs that deliver education, training and mentoring for prospective small business entrepreneurs. Its Community Investment Trust seeks to mobilize small community investments (ranging from US$10 to US$100) in selected commercial properties that are not only affordable venues for small businesses, but can also generate profit dividends for investors from local community in return. The organization also establishes Individual Development Accounts (IDAs) and provides Small Business Grants of up to US$3000 through established IDAs for eligible families and individuals who complete specific sets of business training offered by the organization. The organization hosts a Women's Business Center that aims to empower start-up female entrepreneurs through training, microloan and grant provisions. For former prisoners seeking re-integration into the community in Portland, Oregon, Mercy Corps Northwest also operates the Reentry Transition Center that offers joint business and social reentry training curricula that assist ex-offenders with managing independent and successful lives after being released from prison.

== Objective-specific example programs ==
=== Agriculture ===
==== Market-oriented agricultural development ====
A number of Mercy Corps' agriculture-related programs are jointly delivered with objectives in other areas such as water conservation, disaster resilience, emergency crisis response and market system development. For example, Mercy Corps establishes partnerships with local farmers or agribusinesses to stimulate local market exchanges in Uganda, with the ultimate target to not only help farmers gain market competitiveness, but also make affordable food choices more accessible for local populations living in deprived conditions, including incoming refugees within Uganda and from neighboring countries in crisis. In response to the food crisis of the mid-1990s and at the request of North Korea, Mercy Corps began their work in 1996 focusing in the areas of local agricultural development. Throughout the duration of its presence, Mercy Corps has moved from food assistance to working on long-term agricultural and economic solutions: apple trees and fish farms and cross-cultural exchange. The effort involves aid workers living in Pyongyang, and in Chagang and North Pyongan provinces to visit families, monitor distribution and assess impact.

Mercy Corps offers a number of agriculture-oriented programs in various countries, often delivered with water conservation and disaster prevention focuses. In Timor-Leste, for example, Mercy Corps seeks to build "market-based incentives to mitigation activities" so that local farmers are able to exercise different types of farming practices with different weather-resistance characteristics. By providing them with seed and farming assistance, these practices can enable Timorese farmers to contribute more "nutritious food source to households and to local markets" all the while diversifying farming practices so that "communities are not so reliant on one or two key crops for income and nutrition." In Syria since 2011, it has been supporting an estimate of 9,000 local farmers and small gardeners by providing technical assistance in seasonal planting to mitigate with not only natural weather conditions but also man-made humanitarian crises on the ground. The organization purchases seeds for local farmers to reduce the investment cost of crop production in the post-Syrian war environment with destroyed infrastructure, and provide technical and business training that teach farmers efficient ways of planting and cultivation, as well as exchanging surplus productions in local markets.

=== Food security ===
Like most of its other development programs, Mercy Corps work to "provide communities with the tools and support they need to transform their own lives to support resilient well-being." With regard to food security, it targets five main areas for development: Pro-Poor Markets, Empowerment, Good Governance, Human Well-Being, and Economic Health. It has been maintaining the main aim to providing its beneficiary population with necessary tools (both technical and material) and assisting them with utilizing these particular tools for the advancement of their own well-being.

In Niger, Mercy Corps jointly delivered the "Sawki" Program with Africare and Helen Keller International. The program, funded by USAID, aimed to respond to the food security needs of a reported 118,000 people in the most vulnerable regions of the country, including Maradi and Zinder. Understanding that 60% of the marginalized population in the program's target areas were children of severe malnutrition, the program sought to " bring together complementary activities in nutrition, health, agriculture, livestock husbandry, livelihoods promotion, and market development," with an emphasized focal point on the empowerment of adolescent girls.

From 2009 to 2013, Mercy Corps has delivered a SECURE program in Timor-Leste that seeks to relieve and prevent agriculture related damages caused by extreme rainfalls by connecting local blacksmiths who are able to produce effective small and medium-sized metal silos to broader rural farming populations. In collaboration with the United Nations Food and Agriculture Organization (FAO), Mercy Corps provided local farmers with subsidies for local farmers to purchase silos, while the FAO provided training and material assistance for blacksmiths to produce.

Mercy Corps has also been operating in post-conflict Uganda since 2009: as the state approaches societal recovery, it has been facing a range of development challenges, one of which being the production under-capacity of the farming sector. The Revitalizing Agricultural Incomes and New markets (RAIN) program was created to target key areas that are detrimental for long-term assurance of food security, including financial services for small and medium agro-businesses at the local level, advising larger food-related enterprises for agricultural investment opportunities at the regional and national level, and technical training for returning farmers at the individual level. In parallel of training programs for the farmer communities that seek to improve land-capacity, growth and cultivation capacity and production efficiency, Mercy Corps has also been facilitating various actors within the domestic market chain to promote better access and more extensive availability of financial services and market platforms to ensure the continuous operation of the agricultural supply and demand chains, with the broader objective to encourage sustainable food security.

=== Children & youth ===
==== Youth economic empowerment ====
Mercy Corps has been operating the PROSPECTS program in Liberia with the support of Exxon Mobil, Coca Cola Africa Foundation and the Swedish Government. The program, at its third phase as of 2018, has been focused in improving livelihoods of close to 12,000 vulnerable Liberian youth by providing them pre-employment and entrepreneurial trainings, apprenticeships in 15 partnering host enterprises all the while stimulating overall local markets. It is expected that the program will be able to reach 19,000 youth from Bong, Nimba and Montserrado counties in Liberia with a range of skill training and cash grants to obtain employment or start small businesses.

In the Gaza Strip, Mercy Corps created Gaza Sky Geeks in 2011 with the support of a seed funding from Google, the Coca-Cola Foundation, Skoll and various local donors. The particular initiative seeks to create a stage for new, young talents to grow and share their ideas while improving their skills through receiving professional mentoring and performing hands-on work. It also works to encourage female startup members within the IT community to engage in business and software engineering activities. The Gaza Sky Geeks also provide considerable start-up grants for eligible young IT entrepreneurs to begin their businesses in the challenging market environment of Gaza. It hosts up to 140 people a day, with almost half of those hosted being women, with a prospective second location opening in the near future. Meanwhile, it has promoted local youth startups that receive significant attention from large U.S. technology firms such as Strips and Silicon Valley Bank.

=== Economic opportunity ===
==== Fostering microfinance ====
Mercy Corps has been facilitating programs that deliver micro-financial services to individuals in different community contexts to promote long-term, self-sustainable economic growth. These particular programs offer small, short-term business loans to people of economically deprived conditions for them to start-up local businesses gain financial independence.

Domestically within the United States, Mercy Corps Northwest partners with the AmeriCorps VISTA and offers small business loans and grants to help eligible individuals with jump-starting their own small enterprises. Internationally, Mercy Corps offers microcredits to people living in transitional or developing contexts through its networks of affiliations with banking sectors across the globe.

For example, in Indonesia and the Philippines, Mercy Corps announced the Maximizing Financial Access and Innovation at Scale (MAXIS) initiative that would the establishment of Bank Andara, a commercial bank that would partner with a broad network of microfinance institutions in the region to provide access to microfinancial services to, reportedly, 12 million Indonesian and 5 million Filipino nationals living in poverty through innovative strategies. The MAXIS initiative, funded by the Bill and Melinda Gates Foundation in 2008, also provided financial and technical assistance that increased the operational capacity of Indonesia's Microfinance Innovations Center for Resources and Alternatives (MICRA) to provide extended means of assistance to 851 Indonesian poverty-focused microfinancial institutions. Mercy Corps also implemented similar actions in the Philippines to provide technical and research support to other 359 Filipino microfinancial institutions that provide durable financial capacity-building services.

Another example would be the Asian Credit Fund in Kazakhstan, a microfinancial institution facilitated by Mercy Corps, was able to obtain an operational loan totaled in US$1.8 million from the Grameen Credit Agricole Foundation to deliver microfinancial services to people of deprived conditions individual micro-loans with terms of six months to one year, all the while providing education in financial literacy and environmental sustainability. The Asian Credit Fund is reported to have 37 offices, 21,000 borrowers of which 92% are female, and a US$8.7 million gross loan deliverance profile.

As of 2018, it is reported that Mercy Corps has distributed US$1.4 billion in forms of micro-loans to 244,315 clients globally.

Mercy Corps' Financial Affiliates and Countries of Operation
Affiliated Institutions	Country of Operation
Xac Bank	Mongolia
Partner (Partner Microcredit Organization)	Bosnia and Herzegovina
IMON International	Tajikistan
Kompanion Financial Group LLC	Kyrgyzstan
Asian Credit Fund (ACF)	Kazakhstan
Ariana Financial Services Group (AFS)	Afghanistan (Kabul)
Agency for Finance (AfK)	Kosovo
Chinese Foundation for Poverty Alleviation (CFPA)	China
Microfinance Innovation Centre for Resources and Alternatives (MICRA)	Indonesia
Maximizing Financial Access and Innovation at Scale (MAXIS)	Indonesia and the Philippines
Bank Andara	Indonesia
Poverty Alleviation in the Tumen River Area (PARTA)	China
Borshud	Tajikistan
Community Health and Microcredit	Guatemala

=== Education ===
Mercy Corps' SAFE (abbreviation of Supporting Adolescent Girls' Future through Second Chance Education) School program in Niger ensures vital access for young adolescent girls to basic extents of education despite the nation's difficult socio-economic conditions. The program is a part of Mercy Corps' SAFE program series that, together, have the overall aim to improve the well-being of the female population in target areas. In collaboration with N's Ministry of Education and a local non-government organization, Organisation Nigerienne des Educateurs Novateurs, the SAFE School program sought to help "adolescent girls from vulnerable households to enter or re-enter the education system." Since its launch, it has engaged nearly 500 girls and 27 teachers (mostly female), as well as provided 20 learning centers with diversified management and teaching skills.

In Kailali, Nepal, Mercy Corps implemented the Education of Marginalized Girls in Kailali from 2013 to 2017. The program seeks to broaden the spectrum of education for local girls in far western Nepal through organizing girls' education hubs/clubs that encourage girls to continue their education above the necessary education nationally established time frame (after obtaining the School Leaving Certificate), all the while persuading girls who have dropped out of their education to return to school. In addition, the program has also funded school curriculum in natural sciences, math, English and sexual health education to ensure the targeted adolescent girl population have extensive exposure to knowledge that are necessary for maintaining proper livelihoods. Mercy Corps has also created two tool kits as one of the many elements of its deliverance of programs that encourage inclusive education for children with disabilities in Jordan, including various worksheets, plans, exercises and checklists to aid targeted disabled student populations with better managing their curriculum.

In 2018, Mercy Corps, in collaboration with Educate A Child (EAC) and implemented through a consortium with Mercy USA, spearheaded the Wax Bar Carruurta Soomaaliyeed, also known as the Educate Somali Children (ESC) program. This three-year program aimed to enhance access to high-quality and inclusive primary education for 42,071 Somali Out-of-School-Children (OOSC) residing in the Federal Member States of Galmudug, Hirshabelle, South West, Jubbaland, and Banadir region, as well as in Puntland and Somaliland.

=== Women & gender ===
Mercy Corps has facilitated linkages between gender dimensions and positive aspects of long-term market development. In the United States, Mercy Corps Northwest facilitates the Women's Business Center that seeks to empower, grow and support female entrepreneurs in the state of Oregon by providing them with business training, a discussion platform and operation grants/loans.

In Nigeria, the organization has recognized that a notable percentage of the adolescent girls want to start a small enterprise, of which most were already engaged in various extents of economic activity. Mercy Corps hence implemented the Adolescent Girls in Northern Nigeria: Financial Inclusion and Entrepreneurship Opportunities Profile program to identify key challenges and barriers for adolescent girls to initiate economic activities and gain a stable revenue to pay for their tuition and living expenses. Around 1800 adolescent girls have been profiled in Northern Nigeria. These profiles would assist Mercy Corps and other related development organizations to facilitate future programs that aim to empower female to engage in entrepreneurial actions and contribute to the improvement of the market capacities of their own communities.

In Afghanistan, Mercy Corps' INVEST program has had a meta-objective on developing durable market capacity of the Southern region of Helmand through introducing vocational education and skills training to local young Afghani population. Funded by the United Kingdom's Department for International Development (DFID), it is specifically designed for the particular demographics of the target region, and has provided specific technical training opportunities for nearly 22,000 young men and women, over 70% of which were able to find employment or self-employment in fields of tailoring, electric, mechanics and plumbing. INVEST's gender-neutral delivery has enabled a significant number of local women to gain a progressive amount of personal autonomy in patriarchal communities where they are still extensively marginalized, all the while contributed to the capacity-building of the overall Afghani market economy.

In Niger, where adolescent girls and women experience increasing exposures to gender-based violence in their communities, Mercy Corps have delivered the SAFE Space and later on, the SAFE Space + Livelihood programs that aims to provide safe platforms for young women and men to have access to accredited information on contraception, sexual health and family planning. Over the life of these programs, Mercy Corps has worked with "15 health care providers at community pharmacies and health centers to ensure that they have increased knowledge in family planning counselling and stock management to improve access to contraception."

=== Emergency response ===
In North Kivu, Democratic Republic of Congo, Mercy Corps delivers the Emergency Assistance to Conflict-Affected Populations (EACAP) program to provide first-hand emergency aid to internally displaced populations in the region created by related domestic instabilities. The program, at its second phase in 2012, operated with the main focuses on economic recovery and WASH (water, sanitation and hygiene) maintenance. Responding to the socio-political effects of the M23-related armed conflicts in Goma and broader North Kivu, Mercy Corps reached to assist a total of 122,769 internally-displaced populations to respond and mitigate existing instabilities.

Operating as part of the Better Than Cash Alliance in the Philippines, Mercy Corps sought to take advantage of existing financial technologies to meet the emergency financial needs for the surviving victims of the Haiyan Typhoon in the country. Rather than relying on the traditional physical cash-transfer methods, Mercy Corps partnered with the BPI Globe BanKO to offer a range of electronic financial services that can deliver emergency recover aid to typhoon survivors. Program beneficiaries were "enrolled in BanKO's mobile savings accounts, through which they received one to three separate electronic cash transfers totaling 3,950 Philippine Pesos (about $90)." The beneficiaries are provided with a SIM telephone card and an ATM cash withdrawal card so that Mercy Corps can send important context-specific financial tips, advice, literacy information via both voice and SMS messages, while BanKO has the opportunity to reach directly to the beneficiaries through electronic banking means. The program has delivered first-hand emergency aids and access to more efficient financial management tools to more than 25,000 households affected by the Haiyan Typhoon.

== Disputes and criticisms ==
In May, 2017, Mercy Corps publicly announced that it had commenced the investigation of two staff members in its refugee program stations in Greece after receiving a call through the complaint hotline with regard to the "serious misconduct" of addressed workers. After the Greek representative officials probed into the issue with regard to two staff from an unnamed, European Union-funded non-government organization having sexually violated refugees and misused the financial resource that was allocated solely for refugee use. Responding to the particular probe, Mercy Corps has launched related investigations, and the two identified staff members were put on leave with further decisions on behavior outcomes to be made.

The Charity Navigator gave Mercy Corps a 3-star overall rating, a 2-star financial rating and a 4-star accountability and transparency rating for the 2019 fiscal year.

In 2019, senior staff resigned following public disclosure of the organization's longtime inaction over its co-founder's sexual abuse of his daughter.

The Charity Navigator gave Mercy Corps an overall score of 92%, earning it a Four-Star rating (the highest possible) for the 2024 fiscal year.
