= Said bin Mohammed bin Ahmed Al Saqri =

Omani politician

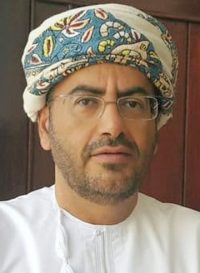

Minister of Economy
- Incumbent
- Assumed office 18 August 2020 to 12 January 2026
- Monarch: Haitham bin Tariq
- Prime Minister: Haitham bin Tariq

Personal details
- Education: Boston University (M); Victoria University (PhD)

Said bin Mohammed bin Ahmed Al Saqri is the Omani Minister of Economy. He was appointed as minister on 18 August 2020.

== Education ==
Al Saqri holds a master's degree in Science and Financial Economics (2000) from the Boston University and a Doctor in Economics from the Victoria University.

== Career ==
Al Saqri was an economic researcher and from 1997 until 2017, he worked as the director of the Office of the Advisor to Sultan Qaboos for Economic Planning Affairs.

In 2017, he became an economic advisor at the Gulf Cooperation Council (GCC) Statistical Center.

Al Saqri ist the vice-chairman of the Board of Governors of the Central Bank of Oman.

He is chairperson of the Oman Economic Association, of which he was previously president.

Additionally, Al Saqri has worked as a lecturer at Sultan Qaboos University, Arab Open University and AMIDEAST.

Since 18 August 2020, Al Saqri has been the Minister of Economy.

== Honors ==
=== National honors ===
- Oman:
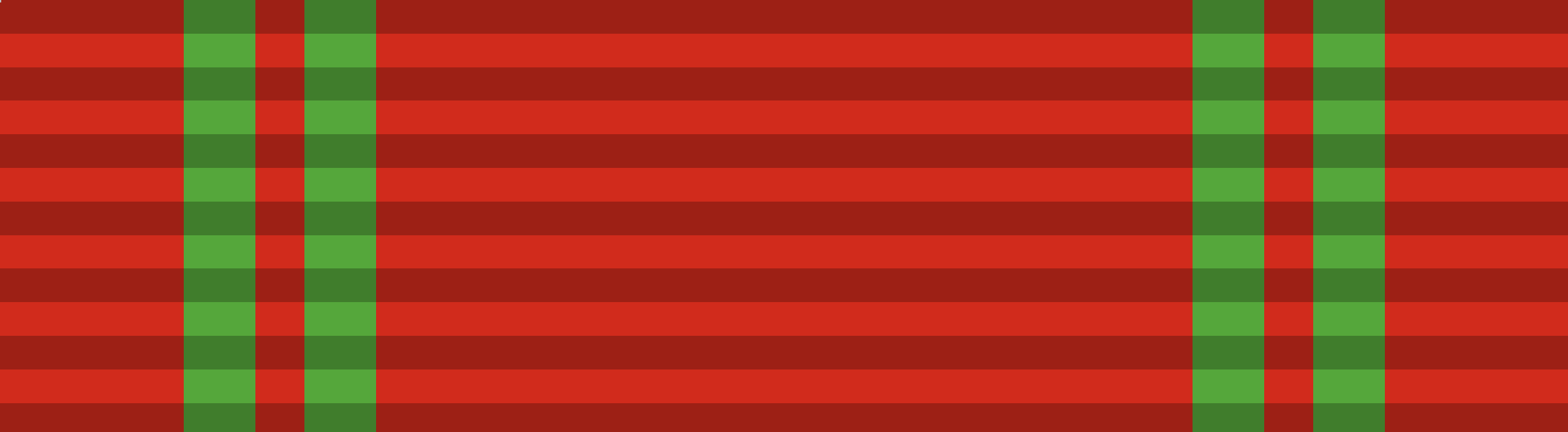
  - Second Class of the Civil Order of Oman (18 November 2024).
