= Khalfan bin Saeed bin Mubarak al-Shueili =

Omani politician

Khalfan bin Said bin Mubarak al Shuaili
- خلفان بن سعيد بن مبارك الشعيلي
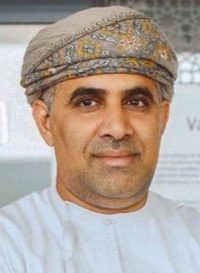

Minister of Housing and Urban Planning
- Incumbent
- Assumed office 18 August 2020
- Monarch: Haitham bin Tariq
- Prime Minister: Haitham bin Tariq
- Preceded by: Saif Al Shabibi

Personal details
- Education: Drexel University (Bachelors), (Masters); University of Glasgow (PhD)

Khalfan bin Saeed bin Mubarak al-Shueili (Arabic: خلفان بن سعيد بن مبارك الشعيلي) is the Omani Minister of Housing and Urban Planning. He was appointed as minister on 18 August 2020.

== Education ==
Al Shuaili holds a Bachelor's degree in Architecture and a Master's degree in Civil Engineering from Drexel University, and a PhD from the University of Glasgow.

== Career ==
From 2011 to 2021, Al Shuaili was General Manager of Operations at Oman Airport Management Company. In 2018, he served as the CEO of Oman Aviation Services.

Since 18 August 2020, he has been the Minister of Housing and Urban Planning.

== Honors ==
=== Nacional honors ===
- Oman:
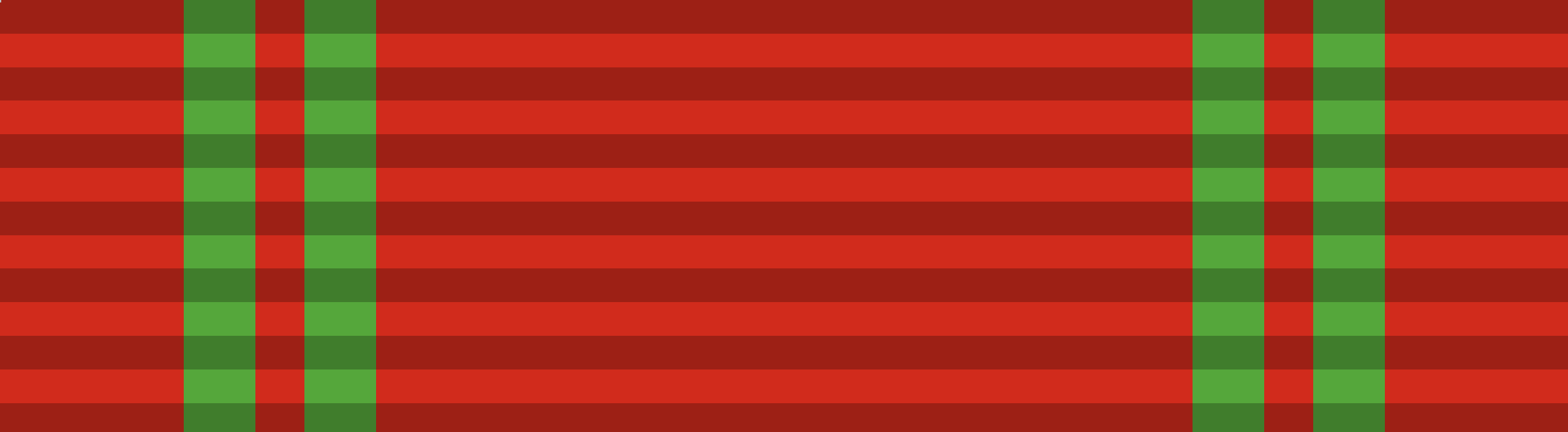
  - Second Class of the Civil Order of Oman (18 November 2024).
