= Gaza Sky Geeks =

Nonprofit startup accelerator in Palestine

- Founded: 2011; 15 years ago
- Founder: Andy Dwonch
- Type: Nonprofit organization, Startup accelerator
- Location: Gaza, Palestine
- Coordinates: 31.512981°N 34.445348°E
- Products: Training Programs, Start-ups Accelators, co-working space
- Director: Alan Al-kadhi
- Key people: Anam Raheem, Kevin Goomis, Rand Safi, Iliana Montauk, Ryan Sturgill
- Parent organization: Mercy Corps
- Employees: 46
- Website: gazaskygeeks.com

Gaza Sky Geeks (GSG), previously known as the Arab Developer Network Initiative, is the first and only tech hub and startup accelerator in Gaza in Palestine. It was founded in 2011 with the backing of the global humanitarian organization Mercy Corps and Google, after Google executives, led by then Google.org and Google[X] head Megan Smith, visited Gaza. GSG has since then been supported by other Silicon Valley companies, such as Microsoft, and by international donors such as the Konrad Adenauer Foundation.

The stated purpose of GSG is to create a stage for young talents to grow while improving their skills through receiving professional mentoring and performing hands-on work. It encourages female startup members within the IT community to engage in business and software engineering activities. It provides start-up grants for young IT entrepreneurs to begin their businesses. GSG hosts up to 140 people a day, with almost half of those being women. A second location opened in Hebron in 2018. Representatives from large tech companies like Uber, Google, SoundCloud, Microsoft, 500 Startups, Endeavor Global, Udacity, Hitachi, and more have visited the tech hub.

== History ==
In 2008 and 2009 employees of Google tried to enter Gaza as part of their developer outreach program but were unable to do so because of the blockade of the Gaza Strip. In 2011 they gained access thanks to Mercy Corps which carried out humanitarian work in Gaza. Google contributed a one-time seed grant of $900,000 which Mercy Corps used to launch the Arab Developer Network Initiative to stimulate tech and entrepreneurship in the isolated enclave. In 2013, the tech hub was developed into an accelerator. In 2014, GSG ran a crowdfunding campaign bringing in $279,000. In 2017, GSG launched two new programs: the Gaza Code Academy and the Freelancing Academy.

A major obstacle for Palestinian freelancers is handling online payments as PayPal is unavailable to Palestinians. In March 2018, MasterCard began researching e-payment solutions for Palestinians.

== Programs ==
Gaza Sky Geeks runs three main programs: Code Academy, GeeXeleator and Skylancer Academy. These were interrupted by the COVID-19 pandemic in the State of Palestine.

=== Code Academy ===
The Code Academy is a six-month long web development bootcamp with 16 students in each cohort (half female), hosted on campuses in Gaza City and Hebron, launched in partnership with a UK-based bootcamp, Founders & Coders in 2017. The curriculum covers test-driven development, JavaScript, relational databases, UX design, and project management.

=== GeeXelerator ===
GeeXelerator is GSG's 16-week pre-seed startup accelerator program. It helps teams build minimum viable products and to validate them with users. In 2018, 34 teams participated in the program. Access to co-working space, fiber internet, and other amenities in the GSG's facilities are provided along with $2,000 in grant money per team that is accepted into the program. Participants are expected to already have a strong business case and are selected through interviews.

GSG runs a related, six-weeks long program, called Idea Labs.

=== SkyLancer Academy ===
The Skylancer Academy (previously known as the Freelance Academy) is GSG's program for teaching freelancing. It offers two full-time tracks providing mentoring to beginning freelancers. The first track is a ten-week program teaching young people already familiar web development, graphical design, mobile development and social media how to succeed as freelancers.

== Impact ==
According to Damian Radcliffe, GSG has helped create over 100 jobs and $91,000 in revenue. GSG has, according to Yolande Knell, helped nearly 30 startups acquire seed money and investment and its freelancing graduates have earned more than $400,000.

== Notes and references ==
=== Bibliography ===
==== Articles ====
- "Gaza Sky Geeks take flight in London". Middle East Monitor. April 13, 2016.
- England, Lucy (August 17, 2015). "Google backed the only startup accelerator in the Gaza Strip". Business Insider.
- Kuchler, Hannah (February 21, 2018). "Gaza, Yemen and a lesson for Big Tech". Financial Times.
- "MasterCard Teams Up with GSG to Overcome Online Payment Hurdles". Gaza Sky Geeks. March 1, 2018.
- Sewell, Abby. "Gaza Sky Geeks – hadaramagazine.com". hadaramagazine.com.
- al-Qedra, Fedaa (November 17, 2018). "Palestinian 'geeks' code their way to a better future in Gaza - Middle East News". Al Jazeera.
- "Meet The Founder of Gaza Sky Geeks". 1776. August 17, 2018.
- Shieber, Jonathan (June 7, 2018). "The Hybrid and Gaza Sky Geeks are helping Arab-Israeli and Palestinian entrepreneurs overcome adversity – TechCrunch". TechCrunch.
- "Gaza Sky Geeks". Gaza Sky Geeks. September 22, 2020.
- "Boosting Employment in Palestinian Tech Sector With Google.org and Source of Hope Foundation". Mercy Corps. October 10, 2011.
- "World Bank Recognises Gaza Sky Geeks As Key Player In Palestine's Tech Startup Ecosystem". Startupscene. June 19, 2018.
- "Gaza Sky Geeks". ORFL.
- Radcliffe, Damian (January 3, 2018). "Key Middle East trends: Experts pick out the big shifts in the region's tech". ZDNet.
- MAGNiTT (August 20, 2018). "Palestine's First Full-stack Code Academy". MAGNiTT.
- Stuart, Hunter (November 30, 2016). "Meet Gaza's female geeks - Palestine". Al Jazeera.
- "Gaza Sky Geeks Selects 10 Startups for the Final Demo Day". Arabnet. September 16, 2018.
- Glausiusz, Josie (March 30, 2019). "Boxed in: The Struggles of Gaza's Technology Entrepreneurs". The Wire.
- "Startup Program". Gaza Sky Geeks. October 19, 2020.
- "Skylancer Academy". Gaza Sky Geeks. September 17, 2020.
- Radcliffe, Damian (January 24, 2017). "With tech skills but not enough electricity, meet Gaza's first startup accelerator". ZDNet.
- Schroeder, Christopher M. (January 10, 2017). "Gaza is attracting the attention of Silicon Valley as young tech entrepreneurs push to solve problems themselves". Vox.
- Holmes, Oliver; Balousha, Hazem (July 5, 2018). "Wireless in Gaza: the whizz-kids making code not war". the Guardian.
- Knell, Yolande (October 1, 2018). "Gaza: Coding in a conflict zone". BBC News.
- Shurrab, Dalia (January 4, 2020). "Exporting Hope". This Week in Palestine.
- "Gaza Tech Hub Finds Success In International Crowdfunding". NPR.org. December 14, 2014.

==== Books ====
- Anid, Nada; Cantileno, Laurie; Morrow, Monique J.; Zafar, Rahilla (9 September 2016). The Internet of Women: Accelerating Culture Change. River Publishers. pp. 19–. ISBN 978-87-93379-68-8.
- Abelmann, Anna; Konarek, Katharina (27 April 2018). The German Political Foundations' Work between Jerusalem, Ramallah and Tel Aviv: A Kaleidoscope of Different Perspectives. Springer. pp. 109–. ISBN 978-3-658-20019-0.
