= Laila bint Ahmed bin Awad al Najjar =

Omani politician

- ليلى بنت أحمد بن عوض النجار
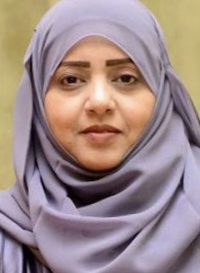

Minister of Social Development
- Incumbent
- Assumed office 18 August 2020
- Monarch: Haitham bin Tariq
- Prime Minister: Haitham bin Tariq
- Preceded by: Muhammad al Kalbani

Personal details
- Born: 1971 (age 54–55)

Laila bint Ahmed bin Awad al Najjar (Arabic: ليلى بنت أحمد بن عوض النجار; born 1971) is the Omani Minister of Social Development. She was appointed as minister on 18 August 2020. Previously she had served as an advisor to the minister since 2014.

== Education ==
Al Najjar holds a Master of Education.

== Honors ==
=== Nacional honors ===
- Oman:
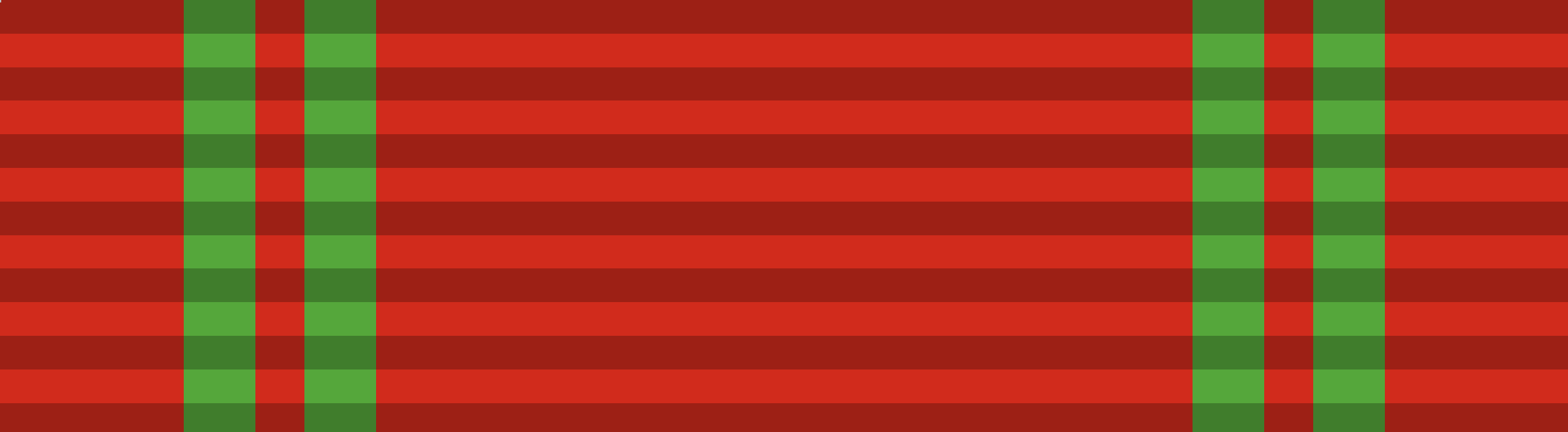
  - Second Class of the Civil Order of Oman (18 November 2024).
