= Ellsworth Culver =

American child sexual predator and humanitarian aid worker

- Born: April 14, 1927; Seattle, Washington, United States
- Died: August 15, 2005 (aged 78); Portland, Oregon, United States
- Education: Asbury University
- Children: Tania Culver

Ellsworth Culver (April 14, 1927 – August 15, 2005) was an American humanitarian and aid worker, and co-founder of Mercy Corps International. He has been publicly accused of sexual abuse by his daughter. In 2006, he was posthumously awarded North Korea's Friendship Medal, the first American to receive the honor.

== Early life and education ==
Ellsworth Culver was born in Seattle, Washington, on April 14, 1927. Culver spent his early childhood in China. He was educated at Asbury College in Kentucky.

== Career ==
Culver lived and taught in pre-Castro Cuba, and subsequently would work in over 90 countries. He began his international career in 1949 as a teacher at the American School in Isle of Pines, Cuba. In 1950, Culver co-founded OC International, a Christian service organization in Asia. From 1958 to 1961, he joined World Vision as Executive Vice President and launched programs in Asia and Latin America.

In 1965, Culver turned his attention stateside to establish corporate community involvement programs in San Francisco, which developed employee task forces to work on emerging inner-city social issues. Over the next ten years, Culver developed programs that expanded to over 75 corporations across the U.S. As a result, he was asked to lead the Alliance for Volunteerism, a coalition of major U.S. voluntary organizations, to develop initiatives to strengthen community action at the local level.

Culver returned to international work in 1978 as the Executive Vice President of Food for the Hungry. His work with refugees included a rescue ship on the South China Sea; refugee camps in Southeast Asia; and food distribution programs in Kenya, Haiti, Pakistan, Peru and Bangladesh. During this time, he established the Hunger Corps, which provided young adults with opportunities for volunteer service to aid famine victims.

=== Mercy Corps ===
Culver joined Mercy Corps in 1982 as the agency's third full-time staff member. Culver directed the expansion of Mercy Corps' international relief and development programs into Africa, the Middle East, and Central America. In Honduras, Culver helped to establish Proyecto Aldea Global (Project Global Village), an indigenous organization that provides training on agricultural methodologies, literacy, health services, and infrastructure development. Culver was instrumental in the development of Mercy Corps Europe and developing new areas of activity for Mercy Corps in Asia and around the world.

Culver served on the boards of the Arca Foundation, a progressive charitable foundation, and Global Action, an agency involved in researching and interpreting international events. He was also chairman of the ProTem Foundation, which provides employment skills training and promotes programs that address family issues related to work, and was a founding board member of the Oregon Inter-Religious Committee for Peace in the Middle East.

Culver spoke at university convocations, civic clubs, churches, panels, workshops and seminars on topics such as citizen involvement in the global community and reflections on current global events and conflicts.

== Sexual assault allegations ==
In 2019, Culver's daughter, Tanya Culver Humphrey, publicly alleged that Culver had sexually abused her for a period of ten years, starting when she was a young child and continuing into her teenage years. Humphrey also alleged that Culver made arrangements for men he knew to sexually abuse other children.

In 2019 the Oregonian released a 10-month investigation regarding credible sexual assault and child abuse allegations against Culver by his daughter Tania Humphrey. Within the investigation, it came to light that Mercy Corps was notified of the allegations twice, in 1994 and again in 2018. Both times they deemed there was 'insufficient evidence', and in 1994 Culver was forced to change positions but remained with Mercy Corps for a decade more. There is substantial evidence of further victims within the U.S., as well as abroad in areas he worked. After the 2019 investigation and its claims of misconduct by the company, multiple executive leaders within Mercy Corps resigned.

Noel Crombie's reporting at OregonLive.com argues that Mercy Corps was aware of Culver's sexual abuse yet allowed him to remain in leadership roles and travel the world on their behalf for another 10 years.

== Awards and recognition ==
Culver visited North Korea more than 20 times, and in 2006, that nation posthumously awarded its Friendship Medal to Culver in recognition of his efforts to alleviate poverty and hunger in the country. He was the first American to earn such a medal from North Korea.

== Death ==
He died in 2005 after experiencing complications with melanoma surgery.
