= Qais Mohammed Al Yousef =

Omani politician

His Excellency Qais Mohammed Al Yousef
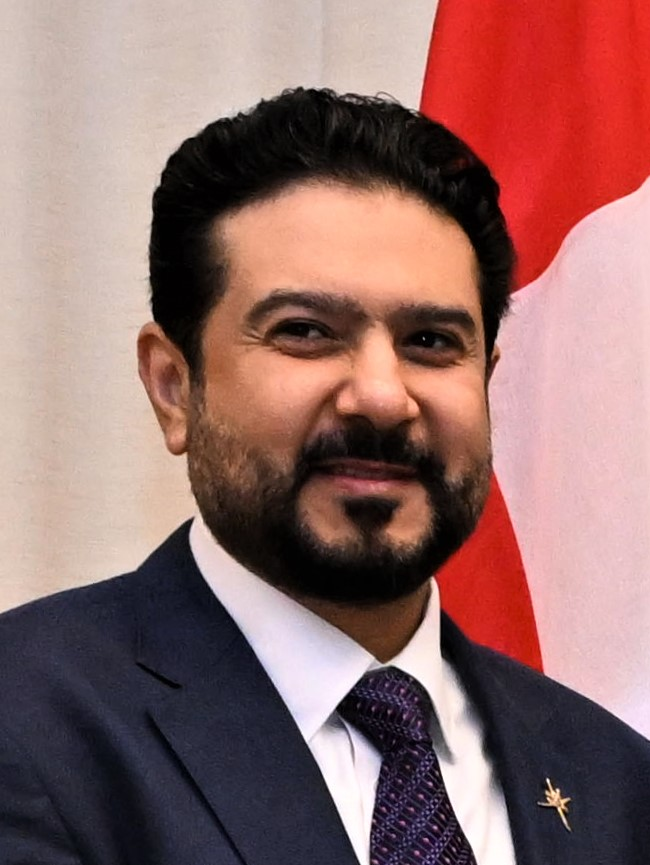

Minister of Commerce, Industry and Investment Promotion
- Incumbent
- Assumed office 18 August 2020
- Monarch: Haitham bin Tariq
- Prime Minister: Haitham bin Tariq

Personal details
- Education: Stanford Graduate School of Business (M)

Qais Mohammed Al Yousef is the Omani Minister of Commerce, Industry and Investment Promotion. He was appointed as minister on 18 August 2020.

== Education ==
Al Yousef holds a bachelor's degree in economics from Williams College and a master's degree in business management from the Stanford Graduate School of Business.

== Career ==
Al Yousef was the chairman of Oman Chamber of Commerce & Industry and CEO of the Al Yousef Group. Additionally, he has served as chairman of the Board of Directors of Al Anwar Holding Company until 2020.

Since 18 August 2020, Al Yousef has been Minister of Commerce, Industry and Investment.
