= Leonard Greenwood (cricketer) =

English cricketer

Personal information
- Full name: Leonard Warwick Greenwood
- Born: 25 March 1899; Toxteth Park, Liverpool, Lancashire, England
- Died: 20 July 1982 (aged 83); Astley, Worcestershire, England
- Batting: Right-handed

Career statistics
Competition	First-class
Matches	5
Runs scored	51
Batting average	7.28
100s/50s	0/0
Top score	25
Catches/stumpings	2/–
- Source: Cricinfo, 8 November 2022

Leonard Warwick Greenwood (25 March 1899 – 20 July 1982) was an English first-class cricketer who played in five matches in the years after the First World War.

He made his debut for Oxford University against Gentlemen of England in May 1919, making 2 in his only innings; this was the first first-class game to be played after the war. The following season he appeared for Somerset against Oxford, making 16 and 0. Between 1922 and 1926 he played three times for Worcestershire, but made only 33 runs in four innings.

During World War I Greenwood was an officer in the Royal Flying Corps and then in the Royal Air Force. He was a master at Abberley Hall School near Worcester.
