= Don Greenwood =

Don Greenwood may refer to:

- Don Greenwood (game designer), board game designer
- Don Greenwood Jr. (1928–1990), American set decorator
- Don Greenwood (American football) (1921–1983), American football player
- Donald D. Greenwood of Greenwood function
