= Culver, Missouri =

Extinct town in Missouri, U.S.

Coordinates: 38.3261323°N 94.2046688°W

Culver is an extinct town in Bates County, in the U.S. state of Missouri.

Culver was founded in the 1890s, and named after A H. Culver, a local storekeeper. A post office called Culver was established in 1894, and remained in operation until 1901.
