= Tony Michell =

British businessman (born 1947)

Tony Michell 토니 미셸
- Born: 3 December 1947; Bromley, England
- Occupation: Managing Director of Korea Associates Business Consultancy (KABC)
- Website: http://www.kabcltd.com

Notes
- Order of Friendship 2nd Class

Tony Michell (born 3 December 1947) is a British businessman, entrepreneur, and pioneer for early Korean development. He has worked with the Korea Development Institute to create policies for the government since 1978. Michell is considered a prime reference point on DPRK issues, and has been featured regularly on Korean broadcasting networks and the BBC.

== Career ==
At the October 1974 general election Michell was the Liberal candidate in Kingston upon Hull West. He then founded a bookshop company whilst continuing to participate in community politics. Throughout this period, Michell worked as the assistant professor in economic history at the University of Hull.

=== World Bank & Korea ===
After Michell gained his PhD, he relocated to Korea to perform his first government project. His assignment was for the Economic Planning Board (EPB) and Korea Development Institute (KDI) on 'Short and Long term Planning and Policy Analysis.' After a successful conclusion, he went on to draft a policy for the Regional Development Research Institute (RDRI) and Korea Institute of Science and Technology (KIST) in 1980.

His contributions to the Korean government soon attracted the attention of the World Bank. He worked on the following projects throughout 1980-1986:

- ILO – "Employment Creation: employment and industrialization and trade in Korea"
- World Bank – "Comprehensive Transport Policy Plan"
- World Bank – "Urban Transportation Studies"
- UNDP – Restructuring Fund: "Truck Regulation Policy"
- UN ESCAP – "Cross Border Joint Venture in Motor Manufacturing in Asia" (2001)

=== Businesses ===
From 1985, Michell worked for The Economist on the project 'Economist Operation Research' which revolved around projects in six countries. He was then employed by Tetra Pak Korea as the Director of Promotion and Logistics.

In 1989, Michell established Euro-Asia Business Consultancy (EABC) in England. Branches were set up in Beijing, Hong Kong, Seoul, and Pyongyang (North Korea). Due to high volume in demand, the South Korean branch became Korea Associates Business Consultancy (KABC); it specifically catered to foreign companies wishing to do mergers/establish base in Korea.

== North Korea ==
Michell at the Pyongsu factory

Michell was responsible for the first wave of foreign investment in the 1990s as the Vice Chairman of Northern Development Consortium. He personally invested in a pharmaceutical project labelled the Pyongsu Joint Venture Company which produces modern medicine in North Korea. Michell maintained friendly relations with the North, giving unbiased situation reports to the media and investors.

=== Humanitarian Award ===
Michell persuaded a large pharmaceutical manufacturer that it could move large quantities of short dated stock from its warehouses across Asia directly to needy recipients without fear of exceeding their shelf life. This donation with a face value of several million pounds was quickly distributed to North Korea where they were instantly consumed by Koreans during the height of the late 1990s period of hardship.

In recognition of his humanitarian efforts to help the people of North Korea, Michell was awarded the Order of Friendship 2nd Class by the DPRK government.

== Media ==
Tony Michell's first appearance on TV was on “University Challenge” in 1968.

=== Interviews ===
- Arirang TV – Prospects of Economic Rebound, Stock Market Rally & Korean Economy
- ABC News – 'Beijing may have offered North Korea aid...’
- BBC News – Questions over North Korea's economic future, Viewpoint: Kim's death and the North Korean economy
- BBC Radio – Economic and Social Challenges to a Confucian Society in a Global Economic Crisis
- Bloomberg L.P. – Nuclear Test Strengthening Kim at Home, North Korean Leadership, International Relations
- CNBC – South Korean Election, Rocket Launch Further Isolates Pyongyang
- CNN – South Korean Economy at Crossroads

=== Newspaper & Publications ===
Michell has written various articles for the following newspapers, on issues ranging from the economy, elections, and social issues to the DPRK.

- 'Samsung Electronics: And the Struggle For Leadership of the Electronics Industry'
- International Herald Tribune
- New York Times
- The Korea Times
- USA Today
- Peterson Institute for International Economics

== Projects ==
International Projects
Year	Project	Location
1985–6	Two Bridge Project	Bangladesh
1986	Padang By-Pass	Indonesia
1987	MRM Feeder Road	Nepal
1989	Second Dhaka Bridge	Bangladesh
1990	Quattar Tunnel	Pakistan
1991	Two Road Project	Papua New Guinea

=== One Million Jobs (OMJ) Report ===
In 1998 Michell worked with Templeton and Citibank as sponsors to develop the One Million Jobs Project. It was a review of the employment potential of Korea if linked to serious in-depth deregulation.

== Academics ==
Michell first entered Corpus Christi, Cambridge University with a scholarship in 1966.

- 1969 – B.A First Class Honours, College Exhibitioner, History
- 1972 – M.A.
- 1978 – PhD, Economic History

=== Cambridge ===
Michell records that he was disappointed with Cambridge and not until his third year did he get the combination of punting and study right to achieve a first in finals. As an undergraduate he had been impressed with the style of Charles Wilson, Professor of Modern History, the leading economic historian of both the early modern period and in his seminal history of Unilever, one of the pioneers of modern business history which remained an influence on Michell's work. Charles Wilson pushed Tony in the direction of regional economic development. Tony was to follow Charles to the European University Institute at Florence to assist in the North Seas study group. Tony stepped in to complete the missing chapter of the Cambridge Economic History Vol V in 1974.

His one continuing relationship from his Cambridge days was with Fiona Macdonald, the renowned children's history author.

=== Hull ===
In autumn 1972 Michell was appointed as an assistant lecturer in the department of economic and social history at the University of Hull (at that time part of the Economics Department). He was provided with accommodation on the ground floor of 32 Pearson Park. In Flat C lived Philip Larkin, who was then librarian of the University of Hull. He recalls that as neighbours they established an acquaintanceship that led to some interesting conversations in the house, at the library, and in the faculty bar. Also at Hull at the time was Andrew Motion although Tony had more to do with Joanna Motion who worked in administration.

The department of Economic History was one of the leading centers of the discipline in the UK under the leadership of John Saville, then at the height of his prestige. As a liberal, Michell did not entirely fit in which the socialist image of the department distracted as it was by the division between Tom Kemp on the Trotskyist left, and Saville's New Left associates.

In these circumstances Michell found himself hanging out with Anthony Minghella, already emerging as a leading playwright, but not yet in movies. Antony based the character Neville on Michell in a now forgotten TV series Studio (1983), which also included Michell's first Korean wife, Pilwha and an explanation of the Korean concept of Han. This was the time when he was writing “A Little Like Drowning” and "What if it is raining?”

Michell remained a member of the faculty of the University of Hull until the end of 1986, although during that period he had leave of absence on a British Academy fellowship to the University of Leuven (Belgium) 1977 and to Korea 1978–1980, to the World Bank 1981 and University of Washington Seattle 1983, and 1984–1986.

== Awards and recognition ==
Order of Friendship 2nd Class recipient.

Cambridge University – Associate Fellow: Faculty of Oriental Studies (2001)

CCIM Korean Chapter
