= Culver Line =

Culver Line refers to the following transit lines in Brooklyn:

- Culver Line (New York City Subway), rapid transit from Downtown Brooklyn to Coney Island, combining the former IND Brooklyn Line and BMT Culver Line
- Culver Shuttle, former remnant of the BMT Culver Line
- Culver Line (surface), the old surface trolley line on McDonald Avenue, built by the Prospect Park and Coney Island Railroad and essentially replaced by the BMT Culver Line
