= John Greenwood (cricketer, born 1851) =

English cricketer

John Greenwood (10 March 1851 – 31 August 1935) was an English cricketer. He was a right-handed batsman and a right-arm medium-pace bowler who played for Surrey. He was born in Epsom and died in Lewes.

Greenwood made three first-class appearances during June 1874, the first notable action of his career being to catch Gloucestershire's WG Grace. He played two further first-class matches, making a top score of 8 runs.

Greenwood retained an upper-order position for the final two matches of his career, despite making a top score of just 8 runs in five innings.
