= Order of Al Said =

Highest order of Oman

Order of Al Said وسام آل سعيد

Awarded by Sultan of Oman
- Type: Dynastic
- Established: 1913
- Country: Oman
- Royal house: Al Bu Sa'id
- Status: Currently constituted
- Founder: Sultan Taimur bin Faisal
- Sovereign: Sultan Haitham bin Tariq
- Classes: Collar

Precedence
- Next (lower): Order of Oman
- Ribbon bar of the order

The Order of Al Said (Arabic: وسام آل سعيد, romanized: Wisam Al-Sa'id) is the highest order of Oman.

== History ==
The order was originally founded by Sultan Taimur bin Faisal in 1913, the first year of his reign. In 1911, he attended the Delhi Durbar of King George V and wanted to create an Omani order after he saw the many orders and decorations of the other attendees. Sultan Taimur awarded the first order to Sheikh Al-Hajj Al-Zubair bin Ali and then to other government officials that were loyal to him.

The order fell into disuse but was brought back by Sultan Qaboos bin Said prior to his state visit to the United Kingdom in March 1982. As the highest ranking order it is typically awarded to foreign heads of state.

== Insignia ==
The insignia was created by Spink & Son to match the design of the older version of the order. It consists of a collar, sash, and star. The ribbon of the sash is red with central green stripe. The badges on the collar and sash are an eight pointed gold star with green enamel petals between each ray with a red enamel center bordered by diamonds. The star has thirteen gold points with three diamond rays between each. The center is green enamel with a ruby border. The collar is alternating with the national emblem of Oman and the crown of Oman surrounded by wreaths.

== Notable recipients ==
- Queen Elizabeth II of the United Kingdom (March 1982)
- King Hussein bin Talal of Jordan
- Queen Beatrix of the Netherlands (January 2012)
- Emir Sabah Al-Ahmad Al-Jaber Al-Sabah (February 2017)
- King Salman of Saudi Arabia (July 2021)
- Sheikh Mohamed bin Zayed Al Nahyan (September 2022)
- Emir Mishal Al-Ahmad Al-Jaber Al-Sabah (February 2024)
- King Abdullah II bin Hussein of Jordan (May 2024)
- President Abdelmadjid Tebboune (October 2024)
- President Recep Tayyip Erdoğan (November 2024)
- King Philippe of Belgium (December 2024)
- King Willem-Alexander of the Netherlands (April 2025)
- King Felipe VI of Spain (November 2025)
- King Charles III of the United Kingdom (October 2026)
- Sultan Hassanal Bolkiah (November 2026)
