= Alex Greenwood (footballer, born 1933) =

English footballer

Personal information
- Full name: Alexander John Greenwood
- Date of birth: 17 June 1933
- Place of birth: Fulham, England
- Date of death: January 2006 (aged 72)
- Place of death: Durham, England
- Position: Full back

Senior career*
Years	Team	Apps	(Gls)
1953	Ferryhill Athletic		
1953–1954	Chelsea	0	(0)
1954–1955	Crystal Palace	2	(0)
1955	Scarborough		
1955–1956	Darlington	8	(0)
1956	Scarborough		
Total		10	(0)
- * Club domestic league appearances and goals

Alexander John Greenwood (17 June 1933 – January 2006) was an English professional footballer who played as a full back in the Football League for Crystal Palace and Darlington.

== Career ==
Born in Fulham, Greenwood played for Ferryhill Athletic, Chelsea, Crystal Palace, Scarborough and Darlington.
