= Culver Lake =

Lake in the state of Minnesota, United States

- Location within Minnesota
- Location: Deuel County, South Dakota and Yellow Medicine County, Minnesota
- Coordinates: 44°42′50″N 96°27′14″W
- Type: lake
- Basin countries: United States
- Surface elevation: 1,654 ft (504 m)

Culver Lake is a natural lake in the U.S. states of Minnesota and South Dakota.

Culver Lake has the name of William Culver.
