= Bobby Greenwood (American football) =

American football player (born 1987)

No. 74
- Position: Defensive end

Personal information
- Born: March 2, 1987 (age 39); Prattville, Alabama, U.S.
- Listed height: 6 ft 5 in (1.96 m)
- Listed weight: 278 lb (126 kg)

Career information
- High school: Prattville (Prattville, Alabama)
- College: Alabama
- NFL draft: 2009: undrafted

Career history
- Kansas City Chiefs (2009–2011)*
- * Offseason or practice squad member only

Awards and highlights
- Freshman All-SEC (2005)
- Stats at Pro Football Reference

Robert Lindsay Greenwood Jr. (born March 2, 1987), commonly known as Bobby Greenwood, is a former defensive end of the National Football League (NFL). He was signed by the Chiefs as an undrafted free agent in 2009. He played college football at Alabama.

At Alabama, Greenwood was a solid contributor on defense for all four seasons. In 2005, he was named to the 2005 All-SEC Freshman Team. Against Auburn in 2008, he blocked a field goal attempt to preserve a 10–0 Crimson Tide lead at the half. The Tide would go on to win 36–0.
