= Tom Greenwood (footballer) =

Australian rules footballer (1889–1935)

Personal information
- Full name: Thomas George Greenwood
- Born: 6 September 1889; Beaufort, Victoria
- Died: 8 January 1935 (aged 45); Melbourne, Victoria

Playing career
Years	Club	Games (Goals)
1918	Essendon	2 (0)

Thomas George Greenwood (6 September 1889 – 8 January 1935) was an Australian rules footballer who played with Essendon in the Victorian Football League (VFL).
