= Frank Culver (NFL) =

American football player (1897–1969)

No. 11, 5
- Positions: End, center

Personal information
- Born: April 24, 1897; Toledo, Ohio, U.S.
- Died: January 13, 1969 (aged 71); Yonkers, New York, U.S.
- Listed height: 5 ft 11 in (1.80 m)
- Listed weight: 175 lb (79 kg)

Career information
- High school: Scott (Toledo, Ohio)
- College: Syracuse

Career history
- Buffalo All-Americans (1923); Rochester Jeffersons (1924); Buffalo Bisons (1924); Canton Bulldogs (1925)
- Stats at Pro Football Reference

Franklin Zham Culver (April 24, 1897 – January 13, 1969) was an American professional football player who played three seasons in the National Football League (NFL), with the Buffalo All-Americans, Rochester Jeffersons, Buffalo Bisons and the Canton Bulldogs. He played from the 1923 season through the 1925 season. Culver's Bisons teammate, Jim Ailinger called Culver "a pretty damn good center" in an interview before his death on March 27, 2001.

Prior to playing in the NFL, Culver played college football at Syracuse. In 1922 he was named the team's captain. Culver was a three-time letterman, in 1920, 1921 and 1922.
