= Oman Medical Specialty Board =

Oman Medical Specialty Board المجلس العماني للاختصاصات الطبية
- Established: April 2, 2006
- President: Dr. Fatma Mohammed Al Ajmi
- Location: Innovation Park Muscat Al Seeb, Oman, Muscat, Oman
- Website: omsb.gov.om

The Oman Medical Specialty Board (OMSB) was established by the Royal Decree No. 31/2006, issued on 03 Rabai-I, 1427 H, corresponding to April 2, 2006. It is an independent body located in Muscat, Sultanate of Oman. It is a Sponsoring Institution accredited by the Accreditation Council for Graduate Medical Education - International, that oversees the Graduate Medical Education in Oman. OMSB formulates standards and criteria for practicing health care professions.
