= Frank P. Culver Jr. =

American judge (1889–1980)

Frank Pugh Culver Jr. (September 25, 1889 – April 10, 1980) was a justice of the Supreme Court of Texas from January 1, 1953, to December 21, 1964.

Born in Birmingham, Alabama, Culver was the son of pastor Frank P. Culver. After attending Morgan Preparatory School in Fayetteville, Tennessee and Birmingham–Southern College in Birmingham, Alabama, he received an undergraduate degree from Vanderbilt University, in Nashville, Tennessee, in 1911. He moved to Texas with his family when his father accepted an appointment as president of what would eventually become Texas Wesleyan University. After working as teacher and principal of Winnsboro High School in Winnsboro, Texas, Culver entered the University of Texas School of Law, graduating in 1914 and entering private practice in Fort Worth. Culver served in the United States Army during World War I, as an artillery officer. In 1928, Culver was appointed to a seat on the 17th District Court. He also served in World War II, in the 8th Service Division, attaining the rank of colonel. In 1950, he was elevated to the Second Court of Civil Appeals, where he served until his election to the Supreme Court of Texas in 1952. He was reelected in 1958, retiring at the end of his second term at the age of 75.

Culver died in a nursing home at the age of 90.

Political offices
Preceded by John H. Sharp	Justice of the Texas Supreme Court; 1953–1964	Succeeded by Jack Pope
