= Thomas E. Greenwood =

Thomas E. Greenwood (May 16, 1859 – May 14, 1934) was a farmer, grain dealer and political figure in Manitoba. He represented Brandon North from 1900 to 1903 in the Legislative Assembly of Manitoba as a Liberal-Conservative.

He was born in Perth County, Canada West, the son of Philip Greenwood and Louisa Dodge, and was educated in Fullarton. In 1882, Greenwood married Annie Brooks. He came west to Manitoba in 1882, bringing horses and cattle with him from Fullarton.

He died in Brandon at the age of 75.
