= Thomas B. Greenwood =

American judge (1872–1946)

Thomas Benton Greenwood (July 2, 1872 – March 26, 1946) was a justice of the Supreme Court of Texas from April 1918 to December 1934.

Political offices
Preceded by James E. Yantis	Justice of the Texas Supreme Court; 1918–1934	Succeeded by John H. Sharp
