= Thomas Greenwood (historian) =

English barrister, academic and historian

- Born: 1790
- Died: 1 November 1871 (aged 80–81); 14 Westbourne Terrace, Hyde Park, London
- Education: St John's College, Cambridge
- Occupations: Historian, author
- Father: Thomas Greenwood

Thomas Greenwood (1790–1871) was an English barrister, academic and historian.

== Life ==
The second son of Thomas Greenwood, a London merchant, he was educated at St John's College, Cambridge, graduating B.A. in 1815 and M.A. in 1831. He entered Gray's Inn on 14 March 1809, and was called to the bar on 24 June 1817.

Greenwood was appointed fellow and reader in history and political literature at the University of Durham, in 1833. In 1837 he was chosen bencher of Gray's Inn, and from 1841 to 1842 he filled the office of treasurer. He died at 14 Westbourne Terrace, Hyde Park, London, on 1 November 1871.

== Works ==
Greenwood published:

- The First Book of the History of the Germans: Barbaric Period (London, 1836), coming down to 772 A.D.
- Cathedra Petri: a Political History of the Great Latin Patriarchate (5 vols., London 1856 to 1865) a scholarly history of the papacy to Pope Innocent III.
- Position and Prospects of the Protestant Churches of Great Britain and Ireland with reference to the proposed establishment of a Roman Hierarchy in this Country, (London, 1851).

== Notes ==
Attribution

This article incorporates text from a publication now in the public domain: Lee, Sidney, ed. (1901). "Greenwood, Thomas". Dictionary of National Biography (1st supplement). Vol. 2. London: Smith, Elder & Co.
