= Thomas Greenwood (activist) =

Thomas J. Greenwood (1908–1988) was an Illinois labor and Indian affairs activist, of Scottish and Cherokee descent.

Greenwood worked as the manager of a shipyard during World War II and was noted for his hiring of Oklahoma Indians and women. After the war, he continued in leadership roles throughout the American Indian community, creating the Indian Service League of Chicago, which functioned as a social club. Greenwood represented Illinois Indians at the National Convention of American Indians in 1953 and helped influence national policies about American Indians as the Chairman of Ways and Means at the American Indian Chicago Conference in June, 1961.

His focus was "furthering the cause of Native American rights." As part of an effort to perpetuate and foment voting rights for American Indians, he joined the Indian Council Fire. He went on to work as a delegate of the Indian Council Fire. In 1961, while chairman of the American Indian Chicago Conference, he helped establish and present to President john F. Kennedy proposoed federal "Indian policy ... as an alternative to the harsh policies of the previous administration." He viewed as central to his life's purpose "the restoration of the environment and the preservation of his 2,000-year-old heritage." He was instrumental in a "successful campaign to preserve 92 miles along the historic Illinois and Michigan Canal" from a proposed propject that would turn it into a landfill. He was involved in writing a history of the Des Plaines River Valley. He presented a plan for a realistic pow-wow during the Tri-Centennial Marquette and Joliet Re-enactment.

He adopted the name White buffalo.

Thomas Greenwood died in 1988 of lung cancer.
