= Frank P. Culver =

Frank Pugh Culver (July 31, 1863, in Lawrenceville, Alabama – June 26, 1949) was a Methodist minister who served as president of Polytechnic College, now Texas Wesleyan University.

Culver received an M.A. degree from Southern University in Greensboro, Alabama in 1888, and thereafter entered the ministry. His first pastoral assignment being at Wetumpka, Alabama. In 1911, he moved to Fort Worth, Texas to become president of Polytechnic College, a position he held or eighteen months before resigning, "after declaring the situation of the college—which owed more than $60,000—to be hopeless". He went on to hold numerous other pastoral positions, including a 12-year period of service as presiding elder of the Cisco, Fort Worth, and Waco districts of Texas.

Culver retired from preaching in 1944, following the death of his wife. Culver himself died in a hospital in Fort Worth following a heart attack, at the age of 85. One of his sons, Frank P. Culver Jr., served on the Supreme Court of Texas.
