= Thomas Greenwood (publisher) =

Thomas Greenwood (9 May 1851 – 9 November 1908) was a British publisher, and an advocate of public libraries

== Life ==
Thomas was the son of William and Nanny Greenwood and was born at Woodley, near Stockport, Cheshire, on 9 May 1851, and educated at the village school. Benefiting by membership of a mutual improvement society run by William Urwick, then congregational minister of Hatherlow, Cheshire, he made use of the Manchester public library and similar institutions.

After serving as clerk in a local hat works, Greenwood was for a short time a traveller with a Sheffield firm, and then for about three years assistant in a branch library at Sheffield. About 1871, he removed to London to join the staff of the Ironmonger. In 1875, with W. Hoseason Smith he founded the firm of Smith, Greenwood & Co., afterwards Scott, Greenwood & Co., printers and publishers of trade journals and technical books. The firm at once founded the Hatters' Gazette, and the Pottery Gazette, an organ of the glass and china industries, and in 1879 the Oil and Colour Trades Journal. Greenwood himself was the main editor of these journals. He superintended all the publications of the firm, which included many important technical works.

His early acquaintance with public libraries and his personal gratitude to them convinced him of the need of increasing their number and improving their organisation. Thanks to his advocacy many rate-supported libraries were opened in London and elsewhere in commemoration of the Golden Jubilee of Queen Victoria. His manual on Public Libraries, their Organisation, Uses and Management, appeared in 1886 and at once took standard rank. The work reached a fifth edition in 1894.

A warm admirer of Edward Edwards, a pioneer of municipal public libraries, Greenwood collected his personal relics and part of his library, and these he presented, with a handsome bookcase, to the Manchester public library, of which Edwards was the first librarian. In 1902, he wrote an interesting biography of Edwards, embodying the early history of the library movement, and he placed a granite monument over Edwards's grave at Niton, Isle of Wight.

Greenwood formed a large bibliographical library, illustrating all phases of bibliographical work and research, which he presented to the Manchester public library in 1906, making additions to it afterwards, and leaving at his death sufficient money for its maintenance. 'The Thomas Greenwood Library for Librarians' contains about 12,000 volumes. He also founded a small library at Hatherlow in honour of his old pastor Williain Urwick.

Formerly a fellow of the Royal Geographical Society, Greenwood travelled extensively, and in Japan in 1907 contracted an illness of which he died at Frith Knowl, Elstree, Hertfordshire, on 9 November 1908. His remains after cremation at Golders Green were interred at Hatherlow congregational church. He married Marianne, daughter of Wilham Pettet, and had a son and two daughters.
